

250001–250100 

|-bgcolor=#d6d6d6
| 250001 ||  || — || December 14, 2001 || Socorro || LINEAR || — || align=right | 4.5 km || 
|-id=002 bgcolor=#d6d6d6
| 250002 ||  || — || December 18, 2001 || Socorro || LINEAR || K-2 || align=right | 2.0 km || 
|-id=003 bgcolor=#d6d6d6
| 250003 ||  || — || December 18, 2001 || Socorro || LINEAR || — || align=right | 3.8 km || 
|-id=004 bgcolor=#d6d6d6
| 250004 ||  || — || December 17, 2001 || Socorro || LINEAR || TEL || align=right | 2.3 km || 
|-id=005 bgcolor=#E9E9E9
| 250005 ||  || — || December 17, 2001 || Socorro || LINEAR || — || align=right | 2.1 km || 
|-id=006 bgcolor=#fefefe
| 250006 || 2002 AT || — || January 5, 2002 || Oizumi || T. Kobayashi || — || align=right | 1.1 km || 
|-id=007 bgcolor=#d6d6d6
| 250007 ||  || — || January 11, 2002 || Desert Eagle || W. K. Y. Yeung || — || align=right | 3.7 km || 
|-id=008 bgcolor=#FA8072
| 250008 ||  || — || January 8, 2002 || Socorro || LINEAR || — || align=right data-sort-value="0.83" | 830 m || 
|-id=009 bgcolor=#d6d6d6
| 250009 ||  || — || January 9, 2002 || Socorro || LINEAR || EOS || align=right | 2.7 km || 
|-id=010 bgcolor=#d6d6d6
| 250010 ||  || — || January 9, 2002 || Socorro || LINEAR || — || align=right | 2.6 km || 
|-id=011 bgcolor=#d6d6d6
| 250011 ||  || — || January 9, 2002 || Socorro || LINEAR || EOS || align=right | 2.7 km || 
|-id=012 bgcolor=#d6d6d6
| 250012 ||  || — || January 9, 2002 || Socorro || LINEAR || — || align=right | 3.5 km || 
|-id=013 bgcolor=#d6d6d6
| 250013 ||  || — || January 8, 2002 || Socorro || LINEAR || — || align=right | 2.5 km || 
|-id=014 bgcolor=#d6d6d6
| 250014 ||  || — || January 8, 2002 || Socorro || LINEAR || — || align=right | 4.4 km || 
|-id=015 bgcolor=#d6d6d6
| 250015 ||  || — || January 9, 2002 || Socorro || LINEAR || EOS || align=right | 3.4 km || 
|-id=016 bgcolor=#fefefe
| 250016 ||  || — || January 8, 2002 || Socorro || LINEAR || — || align=right data-sort-value="0.94" | 940 m || 
|-id=017 bgcolor=#d6d6d6
| 250017 ||  || — || January 9, 2002 || Socorro || LINEAR || — || align=right | 5.2 km || 
|-id=018 bgcolor=#d6d6d6
| 250018 ||  || — || January 13, 2002 || Socorro || LINEAR || TEL || align=right | 2.1 km || 
|-id=019 bgcolor=#d6d6d6
| 250019 ||  || — || January 13, 2002 || Socorro || LINEAR || — || align=right | 4.3 km || 
|-id=020 bgcolor=#fefefe
| 250020 ||  || — || January 13, 2002 || Socorro || LINEAR || — || align=right data-sort-value="0.98" | 980 m || 
|-id=021 bgcolor=#fefefe
| 250021 ||  || — || January 13, 2002 || Socorro || LINEAR || FLO || align=right data-sort-value="0.99" | 990 m || 
|-id=022 bgcolor=#fefefe
| 250022 ||  || — || January 19, 2002 || Kitt Peak || Spacewatch || FLO || align=right data-sort-value="0.77" | 770 m || 
|-id=023 bgcolor=#fefefe
| 250023 ||  || — || February 6, 2002 || Desert Eagle || W. K. Y. Yeung || — || align=right | 1.0 km || 
|-id=024 bgcolor=#fefefe
| 250024 ||  || — || February 6, 2002 || Socorro || LINEAR || FLO || align=right data-sort-value="0.89" | 890 m || 
|-id=025 bgcolor=#d6d6d6
| 250025 ||  || — || February 4, 2002 || Palomar || NEAT || EOS || align=right | 3.1 km || 
|-id=026 bgcolor=#d6d6d6
| 250026 ||  || — || February 5, 2002 || Haleakala || NEAT || — || align=right | 4.8 km || 
|-id=027 bgcolor=#fefefe
| 250027 ||  || — || February 7, 2002 || Socorro || LINEAR || FLO || align=right | 1.0 km || 
|-id=028 bgcolor=#fefefe
| 250028 ||  || — || February 7, 2002 || Bohyunsan || Bohyunsan Obs. || — || align=right data-sort-value="0.87" | 870 m || 
|-id=029 bgcolor=#d6d6d6
| 250029 ||  || — || February 3, 2002 || Haleakala || NEAT || — || align=right | 4.5 km || 
|-id=030 bgcolor=#fefefe
| 250030 ||  || — || February 12, 2002 || Desert Eagle || W. K. Y. Yeung || — || align=right | 1.1 km || 
|-id=031 bgcolor=#d6d6d6
| 250031 ||  || — || February 7, 2002 || Socorro || LINEAR || — || align=right | 5.0 km || 
|-id=032 bgcolor=#d6d6d6
| 250032 ||  || — || February 7, 2002 || Socorro || LINEAR || EOS || align=right | 2.7 km || 
|-id=033 bgcolor=#d6d6d6
| 250033 ||  || — || February 7, 2002 || Socorro || LINEAR || EOS || align=right | 2.5 km || 
|-id=034 bgcolor=#fefefe
| 250034 ||  || — || February 7, 2002 || Socorro || LINEAR || — || align=right | 1.5 km || 
|-id=035 bgcolor=#d6d6d6
| 250035 ||  || — || February 15, 2002 || Bohyunsan || Bohyunsan Obs. || — || align=right | 2.3 km || 
|-id=036 bgcolor=#d6d6d6
| 250036 ||  || — || February 9, 2002 || Kitt Peak || Spacewatch || EOS || align=right | 2.9 km || 
|-id=037 bgcolor=#fefefe
| 250037 ||  || — || February 7, 2002 || Socorro || LINEAR || — || align=right | 1.2 km || 
|-id=038 bgcolor=#d6d6d6
| 250038 ||  || — || February 10, 2002 || Socorro || LINEAR || — || align=right | 5.8 km || 
|-id=039 bgcolor=#d6d6d6
| 250039 ||  || — || February 8, 2002 || Socorro || LINEAR || — || align=right | 4.1 km || 
|-id=040 bgcolor=#fefefe
| 250040 ||  || — || February 8, 2002 || Socorro || LINEAR || — || align=right | 1.3 km || 
|-id=041 bgcolor=#d6d6d6
| 250041 ||  || — || February 10, 2002 || Socorro || LINEAR || — || align=right | 4.7 km || 
|-id=042 bgcolor=#d6d6d6
| 250042 ||  || — || February 10, 2002 || Socorro || LINEAR || EOS || align=right | 3.1 km || 
|-id=043 bgcolor=#d6d6d6
| 250043 ||  || — || February 10, 2002 || Socorro || LINEAR || — || align=right | 5.2 km || 
|-id=044 bgcolor=#d6d6d6
| 250044 ||  || — || February 11, 2002 || Socorro || LINEAR || LIX || align=right | 6.1 km || 
|-id=045 bgcolor=#d6d6d6
| 250045 ||  || — || February 6, 2002 || Palomar || NEAT || LIX || align=right | 5.3 km || 
|-id=046 bgcolor=#d6d6d6
| 250046 ||  || — || February 6, 2002 || Palomar || NEAT || EOS || align=right | 3.2 km || 
|-id=047 bgcolor=#fefefe
| 250047 ||  || — || February 11, 2002 || Socorro || LINEAR || FLO || align=right data-sort-value="0.92" | 920 m || 
|-id=048 bgcolor=#d6d6d6
| 250048 ||  || — || February 15, 2002 || Socorro || LINEAR || ALA || align=right | 4.7 km || 
|-id=049 bgcolor=#d6d6d6
| 250049 ||  || — || February 4, 2002 || Anderson Mesa || LONEOS || — || align=right | 5.0 km || 
|-id=050 bgcolor=#fefefe
| 250050 ||  || — || February 7, 2002 || Palomar || NEAT || — || align=right data-sort-value="0.87" | 870 m || 
|-id=051 bgcolor=#d6d6d6
| 250051 ||  || — || February 10, 2002 || Socorro || LINEAR || — || align=right | 5.1 km || 
|-id=052 bgcolor=#d6d6d6
| 250052 ||  || — || February 10, 2002 || Socorro || LINEAR || — || align=right | 4.6 km || 
|-id=053 bgcolor=#d6d6d6
| 250053 ||  || — || February 12, 2002 || Socorro || LINEAR || — || align=right | 4.8 km || 
|-id=054 bgcolor=#d6d6d6
| 250054 ||  || — || February 12, 2002 || Socorro || LINEAR || — || align=right | 4.5 km || 
|-id=055 bgcolor=#d6d6d6
| 250055 ||  || — || February 14, 2002 || Cerro Tololo || Cerro Tololo Obs. || — || align=right | 5.3 km || 
|-id=056 bgcolor=#E9E9E9
| 250056 ||  || — || February 3, 2002 || Palomar || NEAT || — || align=right | 3.8 km || 
|-id=057 bgcolor=#fefefe
| 250057 ||  || — || February 10, 2002 || Socorro || LINEAR || FLO || align=right data-sort-value="0.97" | 970 m || 
|-id=058 bgcolor=#fefefe
| 250058 ||  || — || February 6, 2002 || La Silla || C. Barbieri || — || align=right data-sort-value="0.79" | 790 m || 
|-id=059 bgcolor=#fefefe
| 250059 ||  || — || February 6, 2002 || Palomar || NEAT || V || align=right data-sort-value="0.86" | 860 m || 
|-id=060 bgcolor=#fefefe
| 250060 ||  || — || February 20, 2002 || Socorro || LINEAR || V || align=right data-sort-value="0.90" | 900 m || 
|-id=061 bgcolor=#d6d6d6
| 250061 ||  || — || March 5, 2002 || Desert Eagle || W. K. Y. Yeung || — || align=right | 7.1 km || 
|-id=062 bgcolor=#d6d6d6
| 250062 ||  || — || March 12, 2002 || Palomar || NEAT || ALA || align=right | 7.2 km || 
|-id=063 bgcolor=#d6d6d6
| 250063 ||  || — || March 9, 2002 || Socorro || LINEAR || — || align=right | 3.4 km || 
|-id=064 bgcolor=#fefefe
| 250064 ||  || — || March 13, 2002 || Socorro || LINEAR || FLO || align=right data-sort-value="0.89" | 890 m || 
|-id=065 bgcolor=#d6d6d6
| 250065 ||  || — || March 13, 2002 || Socorro || LINEAR || EOS || align=right | 2.7 km || 
|-id=066 bgcolor=#fefefe
| 250066 ||  || — || March 13, 2002 || Socorro || LINEAR || — || align=right data-sort-value="0.96" | 960 m || 
|-id=067 bgcolor=#fefefe
| 250067 ||  || — || March 13, 2002 || Socorro || LINEAR || — || align=right | 1.1 km || 
|-id=068 bgcolor=#fefefe
| 250068 ||  || — || March 14, 2002 || Palomar || NEAT || — || align=right | 1.2 km || 
|-id=069 bgcolor=#fefefe
| 250069 ||  || — || March 13, 2002 || Palomar || NEAT || — || align=right | 1.1 km || 
|-id=070 bgcolor=#d6d6d6
| 250070 ||  || — || March 13, 2002 || Palomar || NEAT || EOS || align=right | 2.8 km || 
|-id=071 bgcolor=#d6d6d6
| 250071 ||  || — || March 12, 2002 || Socorro || LINEAR || — || align=right | 6.9 km || 
|-id=072 bgcolor=#fefefe
| 250072 ||  || — || March 15, 2002 || Socorro || LINEAR || V || align=right | 1.1 km || 
|-id=073 bgcolor=#fefefe
| 250073 ||  || — || March 10, 2002 || Kitt Peak || Spacewatch || FLO || align=right | 1.00 km || 
|-id=074 bgcolor=#d6d6d6
| 250074 ||  || — || March 9, 2002 || Kitt Peak || Spacewatch || — || align=right | 3.1 km || 
|-id=075 bgcolor=#d6d6d6
| 250075 ||  || — || March 12, 2002 || Kitt Peak || Spacewatch || HYG || align=right | 3.3 km || 
|-id=076 bgcolor=#d6d6d6
| 250076 ||  || — || March 14, 2002 || Socorro || LINEAR || — || align=right | 5.9 km || 
|-id=077 bgcolor=#d6d6d6
| 250077 ||  || — || March 13, 2002 || Kitt Peak || Spacewatch || — || align=right | 3.0 km || 
|-id=078 bgcolor=#fefefe
| 250078 ||  || — || March 15, 2002 || Palomar || NEAT || NYS || align=right | 1.7 km || 
|-id=079 bgcolor=#d6d6d6
| 250079 ||  || — || March 13, 2002 || Socorro || LINEAR || EUP || align=right | 6.1 km || 
|-id=080 bgcolor=#fefefe
| 250080 ||  || — || March 5, 2002 || Catalina || CSS || — || align=right | 1.3 km || 
|-id=081 bgcolor=#fefefe
| 250081 ||  || — || March 5, 2002 || Apache Point || SDSS || NYS || align=right | 1.6 km || 
|-id=082 bgcolor=#d6d6d6
| 250082 ||  || — || March 6, 2002 || Palomar || NEAT || VER || align=right | 4.9 km || 
|-id=083 bgcolor=#fefefe
| 250083 ||  || — || March 12, 2002 || Palomar || NEAT || ERI || align=right | 1.7 km || 
|-id=084 bgcolor=#d6d6d6
| 250084 ||  || — || March 19, 2002 || Palomar || NEAT || LUT || align=right | 6.1 km || 
|-id=085 bgcolor=#d6d6d6
| 250085 ||  || — || March 20, 2002 || Socorro || LINEAR || — || align=right | 5.6 km || 
|-id=086 bgcolor=#fefefe
| 250086 ||  || — || April 3, 2002 || Palomar || NEAT || PHO || align=right | 2.6 km || 
|-id=087 bgcolor=#d6d6d6
| 250087 ||  || — || April 13, 2002 || Kitt Peak || Spacewatch || THM || align=right | 3.0 km || 
|-id=088 bgcolor=#fefefe
| 250088 ||  || — || April 14, 2002 || Kitt Peak || Spacewatch || — || align=right | 1.2 km || 
|-id=089 bgcolor=#fefefe
| 250089 ||  || — || April 1, 2002 || Palomar || NEAT || NYS || align=right data-sort-value="0.91" | 910 m || 
|-id=090 bgcolor=#fefefe
| 250090 ||  || — || April 4, 2002 || Palomar || NEAT || V || align=right data-sort-value="0.93" | 930 m || 
|-id=091 bgcolor=#fefefe
| 250091 ||  || — || April 8, 2002 || Palomar || NEAT || NYS || align=right data-sort-value="0.88" | 880 m || 
|-id=092 bgcolor=#fefefe
| 250092 ||  || — || April 8, 2002 || Palomar || NEAT || NYS || align=right data-sort-value="0.94" | 940 m || 
|-id=093 bgcolor=#fefefe
| 250093 ||  || — || April 8, 2002 || Kitt Peak || Spacewatch || — || align=right | 1.5 km || 
|-id=094 bgcolor=#d6d6d6
| 250094 ||  || — || April 10, 2002 || Socorro || LINEAR || EUP || align=right | 6.3 km || 
|-id=095 bgcolor=#d6d6d6
| 250095 ||  || — || April 8, 2002 || Palomar || NEAT || — || align=right | 5.5 km || 
|-id=096 bgcolor=#d6d6d6
| 250096 ||  || — || April 10, 2002 || Socorro || LINEAR || EUP || align=right | 5.8 km || 
|-id=097 bgcolor=#fefefe
| 250097 ||  || — || April 10, 2002 || Socorro || LINEAR || ERI || align=right | 2.0 km || 
|-id=098 bgcolor=#fefefe
| 250098 ||  || — || April 10, 2002 || Socorro || LINEAR || — || align=right | 1.7 km || 
|-id=099 bgcolor=#d6d6d6
| 250099 ||  || — || April 12, 2002 || Socorro || LINEAR || ALA || align=right | 6.5 km || 
|-id=100 bgcolor=#fefefe
| 250100 ||  || — || April 13, 2002 || Kitt Peak || Spacewatch || NYS || align=right data-sort-value="0.96" | 960 m || 
|}

250101–250200 

|-bgcolor=#fefefe
| 250101 ||  || — || April 3, 2002 || Palomar || NEAT || — || align=right | 2.0 km || 
|-id=102 bgcolor=#fefefe
| 250102 ||  || — || April 9, 2002 || Palomar || NEAT || FLO || align=right data-sort-value="0.72" | 720 m || 
|-id=103 bgcolor=#fefefe
| 250103 ||  || — || April 16, 2002 || Socorro || LINEAR || PHO || align=right | 2.2 km || 
|-id=104 bgcolor=#fefefe
| 250104 ||  || — || April 19, 2002 || Kitt Peak || Spacewatch || NYS || align=right data-sort-value="0.84" | 840 m || 
|-id=105 bgcolor=#fefefe
| 250105 ||  || — || May 9, 2002 || Socorro || LINEAR || — || align=right | 1.4 km || 
|-id=106 bgcolor=#fefefe
| 250106 ||  || — || May 11, 2002 || Socorro || LINEAR || — || align=right | 1.1 km || 
|-id=107 bgcolor=#d6d6d6
| 250107 ||  || — || May 11, 2002 || Socorro || LINEAR || — || align=right | 4.4 km || 
|-id=108 bgcolor=#fefefe
| 250108 ||  || — || May 11, 2002 || Palomar || NEAT || — || align=right | 1.6 km || 
|-id=109 bgcolor=#d6d6d6
| 250109 ||  || — || May 7, 2002 || Palomar || NEAT || — || align=right | 6.9 km || 
|-id=110 bgcolor=#fefefe
| 250110 ||  || — || May 9, 2002 || Palomar || NEAT || MAS || align=right data-sort-value="0.95" | 950 m || 
|-id=111 bgcolor=#fefefe
| 250111 ||  || — || May 13, 2002 || Socorro || LINEAR || V || align=right data-sort-value="0.78" | 780 m || 
|-id=112 bgcolor=#C7FF8F
| 250112 ||  || — || May 19, 2002 || Palomar || C. Trujillo, M. E. Brown || centaur || align=right | 39 km || 
|-id=113 bgcolor=#fefefe
| 250113 ||  || — || June 2, 2002 || Anderson Mesa || LONEOS || ERI || align=right | 2.3 km || 
|-id=114 bgcolor=#fefefe
| 250114 ||  || — || June 5, 2002 || Socorro || LINEAR || — || align=right | 1.4 km || 
|-id=115 bgcolor=#fefefe
| 250115 ||  || — || June 6, 2002 || Socorro || LINEAR || — || align=right | 1.2 km || 
|-id=116 bgcolor=#fefefe
| 250116 ||  || — || June 9, 2002 || Socorro || LINEAR || — || align=right | 1.2 km || 
|-id=117 bgcolor=#fefefe
| 250117 ||  || — || July 10, 2002 || Campo Imperatore || CINEOS || H || align=right data-sort-value="0.97" | 970 m || 
|-id=118 bgcolor=#fefefe
| 250118 ||  || — || July 11, 2002 || Palomar || NEAT || V || align=right | 1.1 km || 
|-id=119 bgcolor=#fefefe
| 250119 ||  || — || July 20, 2002 || Palomar || NEAT || H || align=right data-sort-value="0.79" | 790 m || 
|-id=120 bgcolor=#fefefe
| 250120 ||  || — || July 18, 2002 || Palomar || NEAT || — || align=right | 1.0 km || 
|-id=121 bgcolor=#fefefe
| 250121 ||  || — || August 6, 2002 || Palomar || NEAT || — || align=right | 2.2 km || 
|-id=122 bgcolor=#E9E9E9
| 250122 ||  || — || August 6, 2002 || Palomar || NEAT || — || align=right | 1.2 km || 
|-id=123 bgcolor=#fefefe
| 250123 ||  || — || August 11, 2002 || Socorro || LINEAR || H || align=right data-sort-value="0.78" | 780 m || 
|-id=124 bgcolor=#d6d6d6
| 250124 ||  || — || August 10, 2002 || Socorro || LINEAR || HIL || align=right | 8.6 km || 
|-id=125 bgcolor=#d6d6d6
| 250125 ||  || — || August 12, 2002 || Socorro || LINEAR || HIL3:2 || align=right | 7.4 km || 
|-id=126 bgcolor=#E9E9E9
| 250126 ||  || — || August 14, 2002 || Socorro || LINEAR || — || align=right | 5.3 km || 
|-id=127 bgcolor=#fefefe
| 250127 ||  || — || August 5, 2002 || Palomar || NEAT || — || align=right | 1.0 km || 
|-id=128 bgcolor=#d6d6d6
| 250128 ||  || — || August 8, 2002 || Palomar || S. F. Hönig || SHU3:2 || align=right | 7.0 km || 
|-id=129 bgcolor=#fefefe
| 250129 ||  || — || August 24, 2002 || Palomar || NEAT || V || align=right | 1.1 km || 
|-id=130 bgcolor=#E9E9E9
| 250130 ||  || — || August 28, 2002 || Palomar || NEAT || — || align=right | 1.7 km || 
|-id=131 bgcolor=#fefefe
| 250131 ||  || — || August 29, 2002 || Palomar || NEAT || V || align=right | 1.2 km || 
|-id=132 bgcolor=#d6d6d6
| 250132 ||  || — || August 29, 2002 || Palomar || S. F. Hönig || SHU3:2 || align=right | 5.5 km || 
|-id=133 bgcolor=#fefefe
| 250133 ||  || — || August 28, 2002 || Palomar || NEAT || — || align=right | 1.0 km || 
|-id=134 bgcolor=#fefefe
| 250134 ||  || — || August 17, 2002 || Palomar || NEAT || — || align=right | 1.1 km || 
|-id=135 bgcolor=#fefefe
| 250135 ||  || — || August 30, 2002 || Palomar || NEAT || KLI || align=right | 1.4 km || 
|-id=136 bgcolor=#d6d6d6
| 250136 ||  || — || August 28, 2002 || Palomar || NEAT || 3:2 || align=right | 4.5 km || 
|-id=137 bgcolor=#E9E9E9
| 250137 ||  || — || September 4, 2002 || Anderson Mesa || LONEOS || — || align=right | 1.1 km || 
|-id=138 bgcolor=#E9E9E9
| 250138 ||  || — || September 5, 2002 || Socorro || LINEAR || — || align=right | 1.2 km || 
|-id=139 bgcolor=#d6d6d6
| 250139 ||  || — || September 4, 2002 || Anderson Mesa || LONEOS || HIL3:2 || align=right | 8.3 km || 
|-id=140 bgcolor=#E9E9E9
| 250140 ||  || — || September 4, 2002 || Palomar || NEAT || — || align=right | 2.3 km || 
|-id=141 bgcolor=#E9E9E9
| 250141 ||  || — || September 4, 2002 || Palomar || NEAT || — || align=right | 1.6 km || 
|-id=142 bgcolor=#d6d6d6
| 250142 ||  || — || September 5, 2002 || Socorro || LINEAR || 3:2 || align=right | 6.2 km || 
|-id=143 bgcolor=#E9E9E9
| 250143 ||  || — || September 5, 2002 || Socorro || LINEAR || — || align=right | 1.1 km || 
|-id=144 bgcolor=#E9E9E9
| 250144 ||  || — || September 5, 2002 || Socorro || LINEAR || — || align=right | 2.2 km || 
|-id=145 bgcolor=#E9E9E9
| 250145 ||  || — || September 11, 2002 || Haleakala || NEAT || — || align=right | 1.9 km || 
|-id=146 bgcolor=#E9E9E9
| 250146 ||  || — || September 11, 2002 || Palomar || NEAT || — || align=right data-sort-value="0.99" | 990 m || 
|-id=147 bgcolor=#d6d6d6
| 250147 ||  || — || September 13, 2002 || Kitt Peak || Spacewatch || 3:2 || align=right | 7.4 km || 
|-id=148 bgcolor=#E9E9E9
| 250148 ||  || — || September 11, 2002 || Palomar || NEAT || — || align=right | 1.7 km || 
|-id=149 bgcolor=#fefefe
| 250149 ||  || — || September 14, 2002 || Haleakala || NEAT || V || align=right data-sort-value="0.84" | 840 m || 
|-id=150 bgcolor=#E9E9E9
| 250150 ||  || — || September 12, 2002 || Palomar || R. Matson || — || align=right data-sort-value="0.80" | 800 m || 
|-id=151 bgcolor=#E9E9E9
| 250151 ||  || — || September 13, 2002 || Palomar || R. Matson || — || align=right | 1.6 km || 
|-id=152 bgcolor=#fefefe
| 250152 ||  || — || September 27, 2002 || Palomar || NEAT || H || align=right | 1.2 km || 
|-id=153 bgcolor=#E9E9E9
| 250153 ||  || — || September 26, 2002 || Palomar || NEAT || — || align=right | 1.1 km || 
|-id=154 bgcolor=#E9E9E9
| 250154 ||  || — || September 28, 2002 || Haleakala || NEAT || EUN || align=right | 2.5 km || 
|-id=155 bgcolor=#E9E9E9
| 250155 ||  || — || October 2, 2002 || Socorro || LINEAR || — || align=right | 1.7 km || 
|-id=156 bgcolor=#E9E9E9
| 250156 ||  || — || October 2, 2002 || Socorro || LINEAR || EUN || align=right | 1.7 km || 
|-id=157 bgcolor=#E9E9E9
| 250157 ||  || — || October 2, 2002 || Socorro || LINEAR || — || align=right | 1.3 km || 
|-id=158 bgcolor=#E9E9E9
| 250158 ||  || — || October 2, 2002 || Socorro || LINEAR || RAF || align=right | 1.1 km || 
|-id=159 bgcolor=#E9E9E9
| 250159 ||  || — || October 2, 2002 || Socorro || LINEAR || — || align=right | 1.5 km || 
|-id=160 bgcolor=#E9E9E9
| 250160 ||  || — || October 2, 2002 || Socorro || LINEAR || — || align=right | 1.5 km || 
|-id=161 bgcolor=#E9E9E9
| 250161 ||  || — || October 2, 2002 || Socorro || LINEAR || MIT || align=right | 3.7 km || 
|-id=162 bgcolor=#FFC2E0
| 250162 ||  || — || October 2, 2002 || Haleakala || NEAT || AMOmoon || align=right data-sort-value="0.49" | 490 m || 
|-id=163 bgcolor=#E9E9E9
| 250163 ||  || — || October 7, 2002 || Socorro || LINEAR || — || align=right | 2.3 km || 
|-id=164 bgcolor=#E9E9E9
| 250164 Hannsruder ||  ||  || October 10, 2002 || Trebur || M. Kretlow || — || align=right | 1.4 km || 
|-id=165 bgcolor=#E9E9E9
| 250165 ||  || — || October 3, 2002 || Palomar || NEAT || — || align=right | 1.4 km || 
|-id=166 bgcolor=#E9E9E9
| 250166 ||  || — || October 1, 2002 || Anderson Mesa || LONEOS || — || align=right | 1.3 km || 
|-id=167 bgcolor=#E9E9E9
| 250167 ||  || — || October 3, 2002 || Socorro || LINEAR || — || align=right | 1.6 km || 
|-id=168 bgcolor=#E9E9E9
| 250168 ||  || — || October 4, 2002 || Socorro || LINEAR || — || align=right | 2.2 km || 
|-id=169 bgcolor=#E9E9E9
| 250169 ||  || — || October 4, 2002 || Socorro || LINEAR || critical || align=right data-sort-value="0.90" | 900 m || 
|-id=170 bgcolor=#fefefe
| 250170 ||  || — || October 3, 2002 || Palomar || NEAT || — || align=right | 1.8 km || 
|-id=171 bgcolor=#E9E9E9
| 250171 ||  || — || October 4, 2002 || Socorro || LINEAR || MAR || align=right | 1.5 km || 
|-id=172 bgcolor=#E9E9E9
| 250172 ||  || — || October 4, 2002 || Socorro || LINEAR || — || align=right | 1.4 km || 
|-id=173 bgcolor=#E9E9E9
| 250173 ||  || — || October 4, 2002 || Socorro || LINEAR || ADE || align=right | 2.3 km || 
|-id=174 bgcolor=#E9E9E9
| 250174 ||  || — || October 4, 2002 || Socorro || LINEAR || — || align=right | 1.2 km || 
|-id=175 bgcolor=#E9E9E9
| 250175 ||  || — || October 6, 2002 || Haleakala || NEAT || — || align=right | 1.8 km || 
|-id=176 bgcolor=#E9E9E9
| 250176 ||  || — || October 7, 2002 || Anderson Mesa || LONEOS || — || align=right | 3.6 km || 
|-id=177 bgcolor=#E9E9E9
| 250177 ||  || — || October 7, 2002 || Socorro || LINEAR || — || align=right | 1.3 km || 
|-id=178 bgcolor=#E9E9E9
| 250178 ||  || — || October 6, 2002 || Socorro || LINEAR || MIT || align=right | 3.0 km || 
|-id=179 bgcolor=#E9E9E9
| 250179 ||  || — || October 6, 2002 || Socorro || LINEAR || — || align=right | 2.1 km || 
|-id=180 bgcolor=#fefefe
| 250180 ||  || — || October 6, 2002 || Socorro || LINEAR || H || align=right | 1.0 km || 
|-id=181 bgcolor=#E9E9E9
| 250181 ||  || — || October 7, 2002 || Anderson Mesa || LONEOS || RAF || align=right | 1.4 km || 
|-id=182 bgcolor=#E9E9E9
| 250182 ||  || — || October 8, 2002 || Anderson Mesa || LONEOS || — || align=right | 1.1 km || 
|-id=183 bgcolor=#E9E9E9
| 250183 ||  || — || October 9, 2002 || Socorro || LINEAR || — || align=right | 1.6 km || 
|-id=184 bgcolor=#E9E9E9
| 250184 ||  || — || October 10, 2002 || Socorro || LINEAR || — || align=right | 1.5 km || 
|-id=185 bgcolor=#E9E9E9
| 250185 ||  || — || October 10, 2002 || Socorro || LINEAR || — || align=right | 1.3 km || 
|-id=186 bgcolor=#E9E9E9
| 250186 ||  || — || October 10, 2002 || Socorro || LINEAR || — || align=right | 2.8 km || 
|-id=187 bgcolor=#E9E9E9
| 250187 ||  || — || October 11, 2002 || Socorro || LINEAR || — || align=right | 1.3 km || 
|-id=188 bgcolor=#E9E9E9
| 250188 ||  || — || October 13, 2002 || Kitt Peak || Spacewatch || — || align=right | 1.1 km || 
|-id=189 bgcolor=#E9E9E9
| 250189 ||  || — || October 15, 2002 || Socorro || LINEAR || — || align=right | 1.7 km || 
|-id=190 bgcolor=#E9E9E9
| 250190 ||  || — || October 5, 2002 || Apache Point || SDSS || — || align=right | 1.0 km || 
|-id=191 bgcolor=#E9E9E9
| 250191 ||  || — || October 5, 2002 || Apache Point || SDSS || — || align=right | 1.3 km || 
|-id=192 bgcolor=#E9E9E9
| 250192 ||  || — || October 31, 2002 || Haleakala || NEAT || — || align=right | 3.7 km || 
|-id=193 bgcolor=#E9E9E9
| 250193 ||  || — || October 30, 2002 || Haleakala || NEAT || — || align=right | 1.3 km || 
|-id=194 bgcolor=#E9E9E9
| 250194 ||  || — || October 29, 2002 || Kitt Peak || Spacewatch || — || align=right | 2.6 km || 
|-id=195 bgcolor=#E9E9E9
| 250195 ||  || — || October 30, 2002 || Haleakala || NEAT || — || align=right | 1.5 km || 
|-id=196 bgcolor=#E9E9E9
| 250196 ||  || — || October 31, 2002 || Kitt Peak || Spacewatch || MIS || align=right | 2.7 km || 
|-id=197 bgcolor=#E9E9E9
| 250197 ||  || — || October 31, 2002 || Anderson Mesa || LONEOS || — || align=right | 1.9 km || 
|-id=198 bgcolor=#E9E9E9
| 250198 ||  || — || October 31, 2002 || Palomar || NEAT || GER || align=right | 1.6 km || 
|-id=199 bgcolor=#E9E9E9
| 250199 ||  || — || October 31, 2002 || Palomar || NEAT || — || align=right | 1.2 km || 
|-id=200 bgcolor=#E9E9E9
| 250200 ||  || — || October 31, 2002 || Socorro || LINEAR || — || align=right | 2.7 km || 
|}

250201–250300 

|-bgcolor=#E9E9E9
| 250201 ||  || — || October 31, 2002 || Palomar || NEAT || WIT || align=right | 1.5 km || 
|-id=202 bgcolor=#E9E9E9
| 250202 ||  || — || October 30, 2002 || Socorro || LINEAR || — || align=right | 1.2 km || 
|-id=203 bgcolor=#E9E9E9
| 250203 ||  || — || October 30, 2002 || Apache Point || SDSS || — || align=right | 1.3 km || 
|-id=204 bgcolor=#E9E9E9
| 250204 ||  || — || October 29, 2002 || Palomar || NEAT || — || align=right | 1.9 km || 
|-id=205 bgcolor=#E9E9E9
| 250205 ||  || — || November 1, 2002 || Palomar || NEAT || — || align=right | 1.8 km || 
|-id=206 bgcolor=#E9E9E9
| 250206 ||  || — || November 1, 2002 || Palomar || NEAT || — || align=right data-sort-value="0.98" | 980 m || 
|-id=207 bgcolor=#E9E9E9
| 250207 ||  || — || November 1, 2002 || Palomar || NEAT || — || align=right | 1.8 km || 
|-id=208 bgcolor=#E9E9E9
| 250208 ||  || — || November 5, 2002 || Anderson Mesa || LONEOS || — || align=right | 1.4 km || 
|-id=209 bgcolor=#E9E9E9
| 250209 ||  || — || November 5, 2002 || Socorro || LINEAR || — || align=right | 2.1 km || 
|-id=210 bgcolor=#E9E9E9
| 250210 ||  || — || November 5, 2002 || Socorro || LINEAR || RAF || align=right | 1.2 km || 
|-id=211 bgcolor=#E9E9E9
| 250211 ||  || — || November 5, 2002 || Socorro || LINEAR || EUN || align=right | 2.0 km || 
|-id=212 bgcolor=#E9E9E9
| 250212 ||  || — || November 5, 2002 || Socorro || LINEAR || — || align=right | 2.7 km || 
|-id=213 bgcolor=#E9E9E9
| 250213 ||  || — || November 5, 2002 || Socorro || LINEAR || ADE || align=right | 2.6 km || 
|-id=214 bgcolor=#E9E9E9
| 250214 ||  || — || November 5, 2002 || Socorro || LINEAR || — || align=right | 1.5 km || 
|-id=215 bgcolor=#E9E9E9
| 250215 ||  || — || November 5, 2002 || Palomar || NEAT || — || align=right | 1.1 km || 
|-id=216 bgcolor=#E9E9E9
| 250216 ||  || — || November 6, 2002 || Socorro || LINEAR || HNS || align=right | 3.9 km || 
|-id=217 bgcolor=#E9E9E9
| 250217 ||  || — || November 7, 2002 || Socorro || LINEAR || — || align=right | 1.3 km || 
|-id=218 bgcolor=#E9E9E9
| 250218 ||  || — || November 7, 2002 || Socorro || LINEAR || — || align=right | 2.4 km || 
|-id=219 bgcolor=#E9E9E9
| 250219 ||  || — || November 8, 2002 || Socorro || LINEAR || — || align=right | 1.1 km || 
|-id=220 bgcolor=#E9E9E9
| 250220 ||  || — || November 8, 2002 || Socorro || LINEAR || EUN || align=right | 2.1 km || 
|-id=221 bgcolor=#E9E9E9
| 250221 ||  || — || November 12, 2002 || Socorro || LINEAR || — || align=right | 2.8 km || 
|-id=222 bgcolor=#E9E9E9
| 250222 ||  || — || November 12, 2002 || Socorro || LINEAR || — || align=right | 1.7 km || 
|-id=223 bgcolor=#E9E9E9
| 250223 ||  || — || November 11, 2002 || Socorro || LINEAR || — || align=right | 1.2 km || 
|-id=224 bgcolor=#fefefe
| 250224 ||  || — || November 11, 2002 || Socorro || LINEAR || H || align=right data-sort-value="0.87" | 870 m || 
|-id=225 bgcolor=#E9E9E9
| 250225 ||  || — || November 13, 2002 || Palomar || NEAT || — || align=right | 2.0 km || 
|-id=226 bgcolor=#E9E9E9
| 250226 ||  || — || November 7, 2002 || Socorro || LINEAR || — || align=right | 2.7 km || 
|-id=227 bgcolor=#E9E9E9
| 250227 ||  || — || November 28, 2002 || Anderson Mesa || LONEOS || — || align=right | 4.2 km || 
|-id=228 bgcolor=#E9E9E9
| 250228 ||  || — || November 30, 2002 || Haleakala || NEAT || EUN || align=right | 1.8 km || 
|-id=229 bgcolor=#E9E9E9
| 250229 ||  || — || December 6, 2002 || Socorro || LINEAR || MIT || align=right | 2.9 km || 
|-id=230 bgcolor=#E9E9E9
| 250230 ||  || — || December 6, 2002 || Socorro || LINEAR || ADE || align=right | 2.8 km || 
|-id=231 bgcolor=#E9E9E9
| 250231 ||  || — || December 10, 2002 || Socorro || LINEAR || — || align=right | 2.5 km || 
|-id=232 bgcolor=#E9E9E9
| 250232 ||  || — || December 10, 2002 || Palomar || NEAT || — || align=right | 1.9 km || 
|-id=233 bgcolor=#E9E9E9
| 250233 ||  || — || December 11, 2002 || Socorro || LINEAR || — || align=right | 2.1 km || 
|-id=234 bgcolor=#E9E9E9
| 250234 ||  || — || December 10, 2002 || Socorro || LINEAR || — || align=right | 2.7 km || 
|-id=235 bgcolor=#E9E9E9
| 250235 ||  || — || December 11, 2002 || Socorro || LINEAR || KON || align=right | 3.1 km || 
|-id=236 bgcolor=#E9E9E9
| 250236 ||  || — || December 11, 2002 || Socorro || LINEAR || — || align=right | 1.9 km || 
|-id=237 bgcolor=#E9E9E9
| 250237 ||  || — || December 11, 2002 || Socorro || LINEAR || — || align=right | 1.4 km || 
|-id=238 bgcolor=#E9E9E9
| 250238 ||  || — || December 11, 2002 || Socorro || LINEAR || — || align=right | 1.5 km || 
|-id=239 bgcolor=#E9E9E9
| 250239 ||  || — || December 11, 2002 || Socorro || LINEAR || — || align=right | 3.9 km || 
|-id=240 bgcolor=#E9E9E9
| 250240 ||  || — || December 11, 2002 || Socorro || LINEAR || — || align=right | 2.3 km || 
|-id=241 bgcolor=#E9E9E9
| 250241 ||  || — || December 11, 2002 || Palomar || NEAT || — || align=right | 3.0 km || 
|-id=242 bgcolor=#E9E9E9
| 250242 ||  || — || December 5, 2002 || Socorro || LINEAR || — || align=right | 1.4 km || 
|-id=243 bgcolor=#E9E9E9
| 250243 ||  || — || December 31, 2002 || Socorro || LINEAR || — || align=right | 3.9 km || 
|-id=244 bgcolor=#fefefe
| 250244 ||  || — || January 1, 2003 || Socorro || LINEAR || H || align=right | 1.1 km || 
|-id=245 bgcolor=#E9E9E9
| 250245 ||  || — || January 7, 2003 || Socorro || LINEAR || — || align=right | 2.1 km || 
|-id=246 bgcolor=#E9E9E9
| 250246 ||  || — || January 7, 2003 || Socorro || LINEAR || — || align=right | 2.4 km || 
|-id=247 bgcolor=#E9E9E9
| 250247 ||  || — || January 7, 2003 || Socorro || LINEAR || — || align=right | 5.4 km || 
|-id=248 bgcolor=#E9E9E9
| 250248 ||  || — || January 5, 2003 || Socorro || LINEAR || — || align=right | 2.6 km || 
|-id=249 bgcolor=#E9E9E9
| 250249 ||  || — || January 8, 2003 || Socorro || LINEAR || — || align=right | 2.3 km || 
|-id=250 bgcolor=#E9E9E9
| 250250 ||  || — || January 7, 2003 || Socorro || LINEAR || ADE || align=right | 4.5 km || 
|-id=251 bgcolor=#E9E9E9
| 250251 ||  || — || January 8, 2003 || Socorro || LINEAR || — || align=right | 3.2 km || 
|-id=252 bgcolor=#E9E9E9
| 250252 ||  || — || January 8, 2003 || Socorro || LINEAR || — || align=right | 2.3 km || 
|-id=253 bgcolor=#E9E9E9
| 250253 ||  || — || January 26, 2003 || Anderson Mesa || LONEOS || — || align=right | 2.3 km || 
|-id=254 bgcolor=#E9E9E9
| 250254 ||  || — || January 25, 2003 || Palomar || NEAT || — || align=right | 1.7 km || 
|-id=255 bgcolor=#E9E9E9
| 250255 ||  || — || January 26, 2003 || Haleakala || NEAT || — || align=right | 2.3 km || 
|-id=256 bgcolor=#E9E9E9
| 250256 ||  || — || January 27, 2003 || Socorro || LINEAR || — || align=right | 2.1 km || 
|-id=257 bgcolor=#E9E9E9
| 250257 ||  || — || January 27, 2003 || Socorro || LINEAR || — || align=right | 2.9 km || 
|-id=258 bgcolor=#E9E9E9
| 250258 ||  || — || January 27, 2003 || Palomar || NEAT || IAN || align=right | 1.1 km || 
|-id=259 bgcolor=#E9E9E9
| 250259 ||  || — || January 27, 2003 || Palomar || NEAT || MAR || align=right | 1.6 km || 
|-id=260 bgcolor=#E9E9E9
| 250260 ||  || — || January 29, 2003 || Palomar || NEAT || — || align=right | 3.5 km || 
|-id=261 bgcolor=#E9E9E9
| 250261 ||  || — || January 31, 2003 || Anderson Mesa || LONEOS || — || align=right | 2.8 km || 
|-id=262 bgcolor=#E9E9E9
| 250262 ||  || — || February 2, 2003 || Socorro || LINEAR || ADE || align=right | 4.3 km || 
|-id=263 bgcolor=#E9E9E9
| 250263 ||  || — || February 1, 2003 || Socorro || LINEAR || — || align=right | 1.3 km || 
|-id=264 bgcolor=#E9E9E9
| 250264 ||  || — || February 2, 2003 || Socorro || LINEAR || — || align=right | 3.8 km || 
|-id=265 bgcolor=#E9E9E9
| 250265 ||  || — || February 3, 2003 || Anderson Mesa || LONEOS || — || align=right | 3.4 km || 
|-id=266 bgcolor=#d6d6d6
| 250266 ||  || — || March 6, 2003 || Palomar || NEAT || JLI || align=right | 4.8 km || 
|-id=267 bgcolor=#fefefe
| 250267 ||  || — || March 28, 2003 || Piszkéstető || K. Sárneczky || — || align=right data-sort-value="0.98" | 980 m || 
|-id=268 bgcolor=#d6d6d6
| 250268 ||  || — || March 23, 2003 || Kitt Peak || Spacewatch || — || align=right | 4.0 km || 
|-id=269 bgcolor=#d6d6d6
| 250269 ||  || — || March 23, 2003 || Kitt Peak || Spacewatch || K-2 || align=right | 1.9 km || 
|-id=270 bgcolor=#d6d6d6
| 250270 ||  || — || March 23, 2003 || Kitt Peak || Spacewatch || — || align=right | 3.6 km || 
|-id=271 bgcolor=#d6d6d6
| 250271 ||  || — || March 24, 2003 || Kitt Peak || Spacewatch || — || align=right | 3.5 km || 
|-id=272 bgcolor=#d6d6d6
| 250272 ||  || — || March 26, 2003 || Palomar || NEAT || — || align=right | 4.1 km || 
|-id=273 bgcolor=#d6d6d6
| 250273 ||  || — || March 26, 2003 || Palomar || NEAT || TIR || align=right | 4.3 km || 
|-id=274 bgcolor=#d6d6d6
| 250274 ||  || — || April 1, 2003 || Socorro || LINEAR || — || align=right | 3.1 km || 
|-id=275 bgcolor=#d6d6d6
| 250275 ||  || — || April 8, 2003 || Socorro || LINEAR || — || align=right | 4.0 km || 
|-id=276 bgcolor=#d6d6d6
| 250276 ||  || — || April 7, 2003 || Kitt Peak || Spacewatch || — || align=right | 4.0 km || 
|-id=277 bgcolor=#fefefe
| 250277 ||  || — || April 24, 2003 || Anderson Mesa || LONEOS || — || align=right data-sort-value="0.98" | 980 m || 
|-id=278 bgcolor=#d6d6d6
| 250278 ||  || — || April 26, 2003 || Kitt Peak || Spacewatch || — || align=right | 3.7 km || 
|-id=279 bgcolor=#fefefe
| 250279 ||  || — || April 25, 2003 || Kitt Peak || Spacewatch || — || align=right data-sort-value="0.76" | 760 m || 
|-id=280 bgcolor=#fefefe
| 250280 ||  || — || April 27, 2003 || Anderson Mesa || LONEOS || — || align=right data-sort-value="0.82" | 820 m || 
|-id=281 bgcolor=#fefefe
| 250281 ||  || — || April 26, 2003 || Kitt Peak || Spacewatch || — || align=right data-sort-value="0.74" | 740 m || 
|-id=282 bgcolor=#fefefe
| 250282 ||  || — || April 25, 2003 || Kitt Peak || Spacewatch || — || align=right data-sort-value="0.74" | 740 m || 
|-id=283 bgcolor=#fefefe
| 250283 ||  || — || April 30, 2003 || Socorro || LINEAR || FLO || align=right data-sort-value="0.98" | 980 m || 
|-id=284 bgcolor=#d6d6d6
| 250284 ||  || — || May 2, 2003 || Socorro || LINEAR || — || align=right | 4.2 km || 
|-id=285 bgcolor=#d6d6d6
| 250285 ||  || — || May 25, 2003 || Kitt Peak || Spacewatch || — || align=right | 3.8 km || 
|-id=286 bgcolor=#fefefe
| 250286 ||  || — || July 21, 2003 || Haleakala || NEAT || — || align=right | 1.7 km || 
|-id=287 bgcolor=#fefefe
| 250287 ||  || — || July 28, 2003 || Reedy Creek || J. Broughton || FLO || align=right data-sort-value="0.87" | 870 m || 
|-id=288 bgcolor=#fefefe
| 250288 ||  || — || July 24, 2003 || Palomar || NEAT || V || align=right data-sort-value="0.87" | 870 m || 
|-id=289 bgcolor=#fefefe
| 250289 ||  || — || July 24, 2003 || Palomar || NEAT || V || align=right data-sort-value="0.69" | 690 m || 
|-id=290 bgcolor=#fefefe
| 250290 ||  || — || July 25, 2003 || Socorro || LINEAR || FLO || align=right | 1.3 km || 
|-id=291 bgcolor=#fefefe
| 250291 ||  || — || August 1, 2003 || Haleakala || NEAT || — || align=right data-sort-value="0.99" | 990 m || 
|-id=292 bgcolor=#fefefe
| 250292 ||  || — || August 1, 2003 || Socorro || LINEAR || FLO || align=right | 1.4 km || 
|-id=293 bgcolor=#fefefe
| 250293 ||  || — || August 19, 2003 || Campo Imperatore || CINEOS || — || align=right data-sort-value="0.85" | 850 m || 
|-id=294 bgcolor=#fefefe
| 250294 ||  || — || August 19, 2003 || Campo Imperatore || CINEOS || V || align=right data-sort-value="0.79" | 790 m || 
|-id=295 bgcolor=#fefefe
| 250295 ||  || — || August 19, 2003 || Campo Imperatore || CINEOS || — || align=right | 1.1 km || 
|-id=296 bgcolor=#fefefe
| 250296 ||  || — || August 22, 2003 || Haleakala || NEAT || — || align=right | 1.1 km || 
|-id=297 bgcolor=#fefefe
| 250297 ||  || — || August 20, 2003 || Palomar || NEAT || V || align=right | 1.0 km || 
|-id=298 bgcolor=#fefefe
| 250298 ||  || — || August 22, 2003 || Socorro || LINEAR || — || align=right | 2.4 km || 
|-id=299 bgcolor=#fefefe
| 250299 ||  || — || August 22, 2003 || Palomar || NEAT || — || align=right | 1.1 km || 
|-id=300 bgcolor=#fefefe
| 250300 ||  || — || August 23, 2003 || Črni Vrh || Črni Vrh || — || align=right | 1.0 km || 
|}

250301–250400 

|-bgcolor=#fefefe
| 250301 ||  || — || August 22, 2003 || Palomar || NEAT || FLO || align=right | 1.5 km || 
|-id=302 bgcolor=#fefefe
| 250302 ||  || — || August 22, 2003 || Socorro || LINEAR || — || align=right data-sort-value="0.93" | 930 m || 
|-id=303 bgcolor=#fefefe
| 250303 ||  || — || August 23, 2003 || Palomar || NEAT || — || align=right data-sort-value="0.97" | 970 m || 
|-id=304 bgcolor=#fefefe
| 250304 ||  || — || August 23, 2003 || Socorro || LINEAR || — || align=right data-sort-value="0.96" | 960 m || 
|-id=305 bgcolor=#fefefe
| 250305 ||  || — || August 23, 2003 || Socorro || LINEAR || — || align=right | 1.1 km || 
|-id=306 bgcolor=#fefefe
| 250306 ||  || — || August 23, 2003 || Socorro || LINEAR || — || align=right | 1.3 km || 
|-id=307 bgcolor=#fefefe
| 250307 ||  || — || August 23, 2003 || Socorro || LINEAR || V || align=right data-sort-value="0.92" | 920 m || 
|-id=308 bgcolor=#FA8072
| 250308 ||  || — || August 24, 2003 || Socorro || LINEAR || — || align=right data-sort-value="0.91" | 910 m || 
|-id=309 bgcolor=#fefefe
| 250309 ||  || — || August 24, 2003 || Socorro || LINEAR || FLO || align=right data-sort-value="0.97" | 970 m || 
|-id=310 bgcolor=#fefefe
| 250310 ||  || — || August 24, 2003 || Socorro || LINEAR || — || align=right | 1.3 km || 
|-id=311 bgcolor=#fefefe
| 250311 ||  || — || August 22, 2003 || Palomar || NEAT || — || align=right data-sort-value="0.91" | 910 m || 
|-id=312 bgcolor=#fefefe
| 250312 ||  || — || August 25, 2003 || Socorro || LINEAR || V || align=right | 1.0 km || 
|-id=313 bgcolor=#fefefe
| 250313 ||  || — || August 31, 2003 || Haleakala || NEAT || FLO || align=right | 1.3 km || 
|-id=314 bgcolor=#fefefe
| 250314 ||  || — || August 31, 2003 || Haleakala || NEAT || — || align=right | 1.1 km || 
|-id=315 bgcolor=#FA8072
| 250315 ||  || — || August 31, 2003 || Haleakala || NEAT || — || align=right | 1.1 km || 
|-id=316 bgcolor=#fefefe
| 250316 ||  || — || September 4, 2003 || Kitt Peak || Spacewatch || FLO || align=right data-sort-value="0.76" | 760 m || 
|-id=317 bgcolor=#fefefe
| 250317 ||  || — || September 15, 2003 || Palomar || NEAT || — || align=right | 1.4 km || 
|-id=318 bgcolor=#fefefe
| 250318 ||  || — || September 15, 2003 || Haleakala || NEAT || — || align=right data-sort-value="0.96" | 960 m || 
|-id=319 bgcolor=#fefefe
| 250319 ||  || — || September 2, 2003 || Socorro || LINEAR || — || align=right data-sort-value="0.61" | 610 m || 
|-id=320 bgcolor=#fefefe
| 250320 ||  || — || September 16, 2003 || Palomar || NEAT || NYS || align=right data-sort-value="0.87" | 870 m || 
|-id=321 bgcolor=#fefefe
| 250321 ||  || — || September 16, 2003 || Kitt Peak || Spacewatch || — || align=right | 1.2 km || 
|-id=322 bgcolor=#fefefe
| 250322 ||  || — || September 17, 2003 || Kitt Peak || Spacewatch || V || align=right data-sort-value="0.95" | 950 m || 
|-id=323 bgcolor=#fefefe
| 250323 ||  || — || September 16, 2003 || Kitt Peak || Spacewatch || NYS || align=right | 2.2 km || 
|-id=324 bgcolor=#fefefe
| 250324 ||  || — || September 16, 2003 || Kitt Peak || Spacewatch || NYS || align=right | 1.4 km || 
|-id=325 bgcolor=#fefefe
| 250325 ||  || — || September 18, 2003 || Palomar || NEAT || ERI || align=right | 2.0 km || 
|-id=326 bgcolor=#fefefe
| 250326 ||  || — || September 18, 2003 || Kitt Peak || Spacewatch || — || align=right | 1.3 km || 
|-id=327 bgcolor=#fefefe
| 250327 ||  || — || September 18, 2003 || Kitt Peak || Spacewatch || — || align=right | 1.4 km || 
|-id=328 bgcolor=#fefefe
| 250328 ||  || — || September 18, 2003 || Kitt Peak || Spacewatch || V || align=right data-sort-value="0.92" | 920 m || 
|-id=329 bgcolor=#fefefe
| 250329 ||  || — || September 18, 2003 || Kitt Peak || Spacewatch || — || align=right | 1.2 km || 
|-id=330 bgcolor=#fefefe
| 250330 ||  || — || September 19, 2003 || Desert Eagle || W. K. Y. Yeung || NYS || align=right data-sort-value="0.83" | 830 m || 
|-id=331 bgcolor=#fefefe
| 250331 ||  || — || September 17, 2003 || Palomar || NEAT || — || align=right | 2.8 km || 
|-id=332 bgcolor=#fefefe
| 250332 ||  || — || September 18, 2003 || Kitt Peak || Spacewatch || NYS || align=right | 2.6 km || 
|-id=333 bgcolor=#fefefe
| 250333 ||  || — || September 20, 2003 || Kitt Peak || Spacewatch || — || align=right data-sort-value="0.95" | 950 m || 
|-id=334 bgcolor=#fefefe
| 250334 ||  || — || September 20, 2003 || Socorro || LINEAR || ERI || align=right | 2.1 km || 
|-id=335 bgcolor=#fefefe
| 250335 ||  || — || September 16, 2003 || Kitt Peak || Spacewatch || FLO || align=right data-sort-value="0.89" | 890 m || 
|-id=336 bgcolor=#fefefe
| 250336 ||  || — || September 16, 2003 || Palomar || NEAT || V || align=right | 1.0 km || 
|-id=337 bgcolor=#fefefe
| 250337 ||  || — || September 20, 2003 || Socorro || LINEAR || V || align=right data-sort-value="0.98" | 980 m || 
|-id=338 bgcolor=#fefefe
| 250338 ||  || — || September 20, 2003 || Palomar || NEAT || V || align=right | 1.2 km || 
|-id=339 bgcolor=#fefefe
| 250339 ||  || — || September 17, 2003 || Socorro || LINEAR || FLO || align=right | 1.6 km || 
|-id=340 bgcolor=#fefefe
| 250340 ||  || — || September 19, 2003 || Anderson Mesa || LONEOS || FLO || align=right | 1.1 km || 
|-id=341 bgcolor=#fefefe
| 250341 ||  || — || September 19, 2003 || Anderson Mesa || LONEOS || V || align=right | 1.0 km || 
|-id=342 bgcolor=#fefefe
| 250342 ||  || — || September 19, 2003 || Anderson Mesa || LONEOS || NYS || align=right data-sort-value="0.84" | 840 m || 
|-id=343 bgcolor=#fefefe
| 250343 ||  || — || September 19, 2003 || Socorro || LINEAR || — || align=right data-sort-value="0.88" | 880 m || 
|-id=344 bgcolor=#fefefe
| 250344 ||  || — || September 21, 2003 || Socorro || LINEAR || ERI || align=right | 2.1 km || 
|-id=345 bgcolor=#fefefe
| 250345 ||  || — || September 21, 2003 || Haleakala || NEAT || V || align=right data-sort-value="0.79" | 790 m || 
|-id=346 bgcolor=#fefefe
| 250346 ||  || — || September 20, 2003 || Palomar || NEAT || V || align=right data-sort-value="0.85" | 850 m || 
|-id=347 bgcolor=#fefefe
| 250347 ||  || — || September 20, 2003 || Palomar || NEAT || V || align=right data-sort-value="0.99" | 990 m || 
|-id=348 bgcolor=#fefefe
| 250348 ||  || — || September 21, 2003 || Anderson Mesa || LONEOS || — || align=right | 1.5 km || 
|-id=349 bgcolor=#fefefe
| 250349 ||  || — || September 24, 2003 || Haleakala || NEAT || — || align=right | 1.2 km || 
|-id=350 bgcolor=#fefefe
| 250350 ||  || — || September 26, 2003 || Socorro || LINEAR || NYS || align=right | 1.8 km || 
|-id=351 bgcolor=#fefefe
| 250351 ||  || — || September 25, 2003 || Palomar || NEAT || FLO || align=right | 1.4 km || 
|-id=352 bgcolor=#fefefe
| 250352 ||  || — || September 27, 2003 || Junk Bond || Junk Bond Obs. || NYS || align=right | 2.0 km || 
|-id=353 bgcolor=#fefefe
| 250353 ||  || — || September 29, 2003 || Desert Eagle || W. K. Y. Yeung || MAS || align=right data-sort-value="0.98" | 980 m || 
|-id=354 bgcolor=#fefefe
| 250354 Lewicdeparis ||  ||  || September 25, 2003 || Saint-Sulpice || B. Christophe || — || align=right data-sort-value="0.82" | 820 m || 
|-id=355 bgcolor=#fefefe
| 250355 ||  || — || September 26, 2003 || Socorro || LINEAR || PHO || align=right | 1.6 km || 
|-id=356 bgcolor=#fefefe
| 250356 ||  || — || September 26, 2003 || Socorro || LINEAR || — || align=right | 1.2 km || 
|-id=357 bgcolor=#fefefe
| 250357 ||  || — || September 27, 2003 || Kitt Peak || Spacewatch || — || align=right | 1.3 km || 
|-id=358 bgcolor=#fefefe
| 250358 ||  || — || September 28, 2003 || Kitt Peak || Spacewatch || — || align=right | 1.3 km || 
|-id=359 bgcolor=#fefefe
| 250359 ||  || — || September 25, 2003 || Haleakala || NEAT || — || align=right | 1.1 km || 
|-id=360 bgcolor=#fefefe
| 250360 ||  || — || September 27, 2003 || Socorro || LINEAR || V || align=right data-sort-value="0.85" | 850 m || 
|-id=361 bgcolor=#fefefe
| 250361 ||  || — || September 27, 2003 || Socorro || LINEAR || V || align=right data-sort-value="0.78" | 780 m || 
|-id=362 bgcolor=#fefefe
| 250362 ||  || — || September 29, 2003 || Anderson Mesa || LONEOS || KLI || align=right | 1.7 km || 
|-id=363 bgcolor=#fefefe
| 250363 ||  || — || September 17, 2003 || Palomar || NEAT || V || align=right | 1.1 km || 
|-id=364 bgcolor=#fefefe
| 250364 ||  || — || September 30, 2003 || Kitt Peak || Spacewatch || — || align=right | 1.3 km || 
|-id=365 bgcolor=#fefefe
| 250365 ||  || — || September 26, 2003 || Socorro || LINEAR || — || align=right | 1.8 km || 
|-id=366 bgcolor=#fefefe
| 250366 ||  || — || September 29, 2003 || Socorro || LINEAR || — || align=right | 1.2 km || 
|-id=367 bgcolor=#fefefe
| 250367 ||  || — || September 19, 2003 || Socorro || LINEAR || NYS || align=right data-sort-value="0.57" | 570 m || 
|-id=368 bgcolor=#fefefe
| 250368 ||  || — || September 26, 2003 || Apache Point || SDSS || — || align=right data-sort-value="0.76" | 760 m || 
|-id=369 bgcolor=#fefefe
| 250369 || 2003 TY || — || October 4, 2003 || Fountain Hills || C. W. Juels, P. R. Holvorcem || — || align=right | 1.6 km || 
|-id=370 bgcolor=#fefefe
| 250370 Obertocitterio ||  ||  || October 12, 2003 || Mauna Kea || F. Bernardi || PHO || align=right | 1.6 km || 
|-id=371 bgcolor=#fefefe
| 250371 ||  || — || October 1, 2003 || Kitt Peak || Spacewatch || — || align=right | 3.0 km || 
|-id=372 bgcolor=#fefefe
| 250372 ||  || — || October 15, 2003 || Anderson Mesa || LONEOS || — || align=right | 1.5 km || 
|-id=373 bgcolor=#fefefe
| 250373 ||  || — || October 15, 2003 || Anderson Mesa || LONEOS || FLO || align=right data-sort-value="0.98" | 980 m || 
|-id=374 bgcolor=#fefefe
| 250374 Jírovec ||  ||  || October 17, 2003 || Kleť || KLENOT || NYS || align=right | 1.9 km || 
|-id=375 bgcolor=#fefefe
| 250375 ||  || — || October 22, 2003 || Kitt Peak || Spacewatch || — || align=right | 2.2 km || 
|-id=376 bgcolor=#fefefe
| 250376 ||  || — || October 21, 2003 || Socorro || LINEAR || — || align=right | 1.8 km || 
|-id=377 bgcolor=#fefefe
| 250377 ||  || — || October 16, 2003 || Kitt Peak || Spacewatch || — || align=right data-sort-value="0.97" | 970 m || 
|-id=378 bgcolor=#fefefe
| 250378 ||  || — || October 16, 2003 || Anderson Mesa || LONEOS || ERI || align=right | 2.0 km || 
|-id=379 bgcolor=#fefefe
| 250379 ||  || — || October 17, 2003 || Kitt Peak || Spacewatch || — || align=right data-sort-value="0.97" | 970 m || 
|-id=380 bgcolor=#fefefe
| 250380 ||  || — || October 16, 2003 || Kitt Peak || Spacewatch || — || align=right | 1.2 km || 
|-id=381 bgcolor=#fefefe
| 250381 ||  || — || October 18, 2003 || Haleakala || NEAT || NYS || align=right | 1.0 km || 
|-id=382 bgcolor=#fefefe
| 250382 ||  || — || October 17, 2003 || Kitt Peak || Spacewatch || FLO || align=right data-sort-value="0.84" | 840 m || 
|-id=383 bgcolor=#fefefe
| 250383 ||  || — || October 20, 2003 || Palomar || NEAT || FLO || align=right | 1.0 km || 
|-id=384 bgcolor=#fefefe
| 250384 ||  || — || October 18, 2003 || Kitt Peak || Spacewatch || V || align=right | 1.1 km || 
|-id=385 bgcolor=#fefefe
| 250385 ||  || — || October 20, 2003 || Socorro || LINEAR || — || align=right | 2.9 km || 
|-id=386 bgcolor=#fefefe
| 250386 ||  || — || October 18, 2003 || Palomar || NEAT || FLO || align=right | 1.4 km || 
|-id=387 bgcolor=#fefefe
| 250387 ||  || — || October 18, 2003 || Palomar || NEAT || FLO || align=right | 1.3 km || 
|-id=388 bgcolor=#fefefe
| 250388 ||  || — || October 18, 2003 || Anderson Mesa || LONEOS || MAS || align=right | 1.0 km || 
|-id=389 bgcolor=#fefefe
| 250389 ||  || — || October 18, 2003 || Anderson Mesa || LONEOS || — || align=right | 2.2 km || 
|-id=390 bgcolor=#fefefe
| 250390 ||  || — || October 18, 2003 || Kitt Peak || Spacewatch || — || align=right | 1.1 km || 
|-id=391 bgcolor=#fefefe
| 250391 ||  || — || October 21, 2003 || Kitt Peak || Spacewatch || — || align=right | 2.1 km || 
|-id=392 bgcolor=#fefefe
| 250392 ||  || — || October 21, 2003 || Palomar || NEAT || — || align=right | 1.2 km || 
|-id=393 bgcolor=#fefefe
| 250393 ||  || — || October 20, 2003 || Palomar || NEAT || — || align=right data-sort-value="0.90" | 900 m || 
|-id=394 bgcolor=#fefefe
| 250394 ||  || — || October 21, 2003 || Socorro || LINEAR || NYS || align=right data-sort-value="0.88" | 880 m || 
|-id=395 bgcolor=#fefefe
| 250395 ||  || — || October 22, 2003 || Socorro || LINEAR || MAS || align=right | 1.2 km || 
|-id=396 bgcolor=#fefefe
| 250396 ||  || — || October 21, 2003 || Anderson Mesa || LONEOS || CHL || align=right | 4.0 km || 
|-id=397 bgcolor=#fefefe
| 250397 ||  || — || October 21, 2003 || Kitt Peak || Spacewatch || V || align=right data-sort-value="0.94" | 940 m || 
|-id=398 bgcolor=#fefefe
| 250398 ||  || — || October 21, 2003 || Palomar || NEAT || MAS || align=right data-sort-value="0.67" | 670 m || 
|-id=399 bgcolor=#fefefe
| 250399 ||  || — || October 21, 2003 || Palomar || NEAT || NYS || align=right | 1.00 km || 
|-id=400 bgcolor=#fefefe
| 250400 ||  || — || October 22, 2003 || Socorro || LINEAR || — || align=right | 1.3 km || 
|}

250401–250500 

|-bgcolor=#fefefe
| 250401 ||  || — || October 22, 2003 || Kitt Peak || Spacewatch || FLO || align=right | 1.5 km || 
|-id=402 bgcolor=#fefefe
| 250402 ||  || — || October 22, 2003 || Haleakala || NEAT || NYS || align=right | 1.6 km || 
|-id=403 bgcolor=#fefefe
| 250403 ||  || — || October 23, 2003 || Kitt Peak || Spacewatch || NYS || align=right data-sort-value="0.89" | 890 m || 
|-id=404 bgcolor=#fefefe
| 250404 ||  || — || October 21, 2003 || Kitt Peak || Spacewatch || — || align=right | 1.2 km || 
|-id=405 bgcolor=#fefefe
| 250405 ||  || — || October 22, 2003 || Socorro || LINEAR || — || align=right | 1.3 km || 
|-id=406 bgcolor=#fefefe
| 250406 ||  || — || October 23, 2003 || Kitt Peak || Spacewatch || FLO || align=right | 1.2 km || 
|-id=407 bgcolor=#fefefe
| 250407 ||  || — || October 23, 2003 || Kitt Peak || Spacewatch || NYS || align=right data-sort-value="0.84" | 840 m || 
|-id=408 bgcolor=#fefefe
| 250408 ||  || — || October 24, 2003 || Socorro || LINEAR || — || align=right | 1.2 km || 
|-id=409 bgcolor=#fefefe
| 250409 ||  || — || October 24, 2003 || Socorro || LINEAR || — || align=right | 1.0 km || 
|-id=410 bgcolor=#fefefe
| 250410 ||  || — || October 26, 2003 || Catalina || CSS || — || align=right | 1.3 km || 
|-id=411 bgcolor=#fefefe
| 250411 ||  || — || October 25, 2003 || Socorro || LINEAR || — || align=right data-sort-value="0.96" | 960 m || 
|-id=412 bgcolor=#fefefe
| 250412 ||  || — || October 29, 2003 || Catalina || CSS || — || align=right | 1.4 km || 
|-id=413 bgcolor=#fefefe
| 250413 ||  || — || October 29, 2003 || Socorro || LINEAR || MAS || align=right data-sort-value="0.88" | 880 m || 
|-id=414 bgcolor=#fefefe
| 250414 ||  || — || October 29, 2003 || Catalina || CSS || NYS || align=right | 1.1 km || 
|-id=415 bgcolor=#fefefe
| 250415 ||  || — || October 17, 2003 || Kitt Peak || Spacewatch || FLO || align=right | 1.0 km || 
|-id=416 bgcolor=#fefefe
| 250416 ||  || — || October 18, 2003 || Apache Point || SDSS || NYS || align=right data-sort-value="0.68" | 680 m || 
|-id=417 bgcolor=#fefefe
| 250417 ||  || — || October 19, 2003 || Apache Point || SDSS || V || align=right data-sort-value="0.87" | 870 m || 
|-id=418 bgcolor=#FA8072
| 250418 ||  || — || November 6, 2003 || Socorro || LINEAR || — || align=right | 1.6 km || 
|-id=419 bgcolor=#fefefe
| 250419 ||  || — || November 3, 2003 || Socorro || LINEAR || — || align=right | 1.1 km || 
|-id=420 bgcolor=#fefefe
| 250420 ||  || — || November 16, 2003 || Catalina || CSS || — || align=right | 2.0 km || 
|-id=421 bgcolor=#fefefe
| 250421 ||  || — || November 19, 2003 || Socorro || LINEAR || — || align=right | 1.2 km || 
|-id=422 bgcolor=#d6d6d6
| 250422 ||  || — || November 19, 2003 || Kitt Peak || Spacewatch || — || align=right | 4.0 km || 
|-id=423 bgcolor=#fefefe
| 250423 ||  || — || November 19, 2003 || Kitt Peak || Spacewatch || — || align=right | 1.4 km || 
|-id=424 bgcolor=#fefefe
| 250424 ||  || — || November 19, 2003 || Kitt Peak || Spacewatch || — || align=right data-sort-value="0.68" | 680 m || 
|-id=425 bgcolor=#fefefe
| 250425 ||  || — || November 20, 2003 || Socorro || LINEAR || — || align=right | 1.5 km || 
|-id=426 bgcolor=#fefefe
| 250426 ||  || — || November 20, 2003 || Socorro || LINEAR || V || align=right data-sort-value="0.89" | 890 m || 
|-id=427 bgcolor=#fefefe
| 250427 ||  || — || November 21, 2003 || Socorro || LINEAR || — || align=right | 1.3 km || 
|-id=428 bgcolor=#fefefe
| 250428 ||  || — || November 16, 2003 || Kitt Peak || Spacewatch || — || align=right | 1.1 km || 
|-id=429 bgcolor=#fefefe
| 250429 ||  || — || November 18, 2003 || Palomar || NEAT || — || align=right | 1.2 km || 
|-id=430 bgcolor=#fefefe
| 250430 ||  || — || November 19, 2003 || Anderson Mesa || LONEOS || V || align=right data-sort-value="0.74" | 740 m || 
|-id=431 bgcolor=#fefefe
| 250431 ||  || — || November 20, 2003 || Socorro || LINEAR || ERI || align=right | 3.3 km || 
|-id=432 bgcolor=#fefefe
| 250432 ||  || — || November 20, 2003 || Socorro || LINEAR || — || align=right | 1.2 km || 
|-id=433 bgcolor=#fefefe
| 250433 ||  || — || November 20, 2003 || Socorro || LINEAR || — || align=right | 1.6 km || 
|-id=434 bgcolor=#fefefe
| 250434 ||  || — || November 21, 2003 || Socorro || LINEAR || NYS || align=right | 1.0 km || 
|-id=435 bgcolor=#fefefe
| 250435 ||  || — || November 21, 2003 || Socorro || LINEAR || — || align=right | 1.2 km || 
|-id=436 bgcolor=#FA8072
| 250436 ||  || — || November 21, 2003 || Socorro || LINEAR || — || align=right | 1.5 km || 
|-id=437 bgcolor=#fefefe
| 250437 ||  || — || November 19, 2003 || Palomar || NEAT || ERI || align=right | 1.9 km || 
|-id=438 bgcolor=#fefefe
| 250438 ||  || — || November 20, 2003 || Catalina || CSS || — || align=right | 2.0 km || 
|-id=439 bgcolor=#fefefe
| 250439 ||  || — || December 14, 2003 || Palomar || NEAT || — || align=right | 1.5 km || 
|-id=440 bgcolor=#fefefe
| 250440 ||  || — || December 14, 2003 || Palomar || NEAT || — || align=right | 1.2 km || 
|-id=441 bgcolor=#fefefe
| 250441 ||  || — || December 1, 2003 || Socorro || LINEAR || — || align=right | 1.4 km || 
|-id=442 bgcolor=#fefefe
| 250442 ||  || — || December 17, 2003 || Kitt Peak || Spacewatch || NYS || align=right data-sort-value="0.95" | 950 m || 
|-id=443 bgcolor=#fefefe
| 250443 ||  || — || December 18, 2003 || Socorro || LINEAR || — || align=right | 1.1 km || 
|-id=444 bgcolor=#fefefe
| 250444 ||  || — || December 19, 2003 || Socorro || LINEAR || V || align=right | 1.1 km || 
|-id=445 bgcolor=#fefefe
| 250445 ||  || — || December 19, 2003 || Socorro || LINEAR || MAS || align=right data-sort-value="0.86" | 860 m || 
|-id=446 bgcolor=#fefefe
| 250446 ||  || — || December 19, 2003 || Kitt Peak || Spacewatch || MAS || align=right | 1.00 km || 
|-id=447 bgcolor=#fefefe
| 250447 ||  || — || December 21, 2003 || Socorro || LINEAR || NYS || align=right data-sort-value="0.86" | 860 m || 
|-id=448 bgcolor=#fefefe
| 250448 ||  || — || December 27, 2003 || Socorro || LINEAR || CLA || align=right | 2.4 km || 
|-id=449 bgcolor=#fefefe
| 250449 ||  || — || December 27, 2003 || Socorro || LINEAR || — || align=right | 1.4 km || 
|-id=450 bgcolor=#fefefe
| 250450 ||  || — || December 27, 2003 || Socorro || LINEAR || — || align=right | 1.4 km || 
|-id=451 bgcolor=#fefefe
| 250451 ||  || — || December 27, 2003 || Socorro || LINEAR || — || align=right | 1.2 km || 
|-id=452 bgcolor=#fefefe
| 250452 ||  || — || December 28, 2003 || Socorro || LINEAR || — || align=right | 2.0 km || 
|-id=453 bgcolor=#fefefe
| 250453 ||  || — || December 17, 2003 || Socorro || LINEAR || SUL || align=right | 3.3 km || 
|-id=454 bgcolor=#E9E9E9
| 250454 ||  || — || January 12, 2004 || Palomar || NEAT || JUN || align=right | 2.2 km || 
|-id=455 bgcolor=#E9E9E9
| 250455 ||  || — || January 16, 2004 || Palomar || NEAT || — || align=right | 1.6 km || 
|-id=456 bgcolor=#fefefe
| 250456 ||  || — || January 16, 2004 || Palomar || NEAT || NYS || align=right data-sort-value="0.97" | 970 m || 
|-id=457 bgcolor=#E9E9E9
| 250457 ||  || — || January 19, 2004 || Kitt Peak || Spacewatch || — || align=right | 2.4 km || 
|-id=458 bgcolor=#FFC2E0
| 250458 ||  || — || January 19, 2004 || Socorro || LINEAR || APO +1km || align=right data-sort-value="0.63" | 630 m || 
|-id=459 bgcolor=#E9E9E9
| 250459 ||  || — || January 22, 2004 || Socorro || LINEAR || — || align=right | 1.4 km || 
|-id=460 bgcolor=#FA8072
| 250460 ||  || — || January 23, 2004 || Anderson Mesa || LONEOS || H || align=right data-sort-value="0.86" | 860 m || 
|-id=461 bgcolor=#E9E9E9
| 250461 ||  || — || January 25, 2004 || Haleakala || NEAT || MAR || align=right | 1.9 km || 
|-id=462 bgcolor=#fefefe
| 250462 ||  || — || January 28, 2004 || Catalina || CSS || H || align=right data-sort-value="0.94" | 940 m || 
|-id=463 bgcolor=#E9E9E9
| 250463 ||  || — || January 23, 2004 || Socorro || LINEAR || — || align=right | 1.6 km || 
|-id=464 bgcolor=#E9E9E9
| 250464 ||  || — || January 24, 2004 || Socorro || LINEAR || — || align=right | 2.9 km || 
|-id=465 bgcolor=#fefefe
| 250465 ||  || — || January 27, 2004 || Catalina || CSS || H || align=right | 1.2 km || 
|-id=466 bgcolor=#E9E9E9
| 250466 ||  || — || January 16, 2004 || Kitt Peak || Spacewatch || — || align=right | 1.6 km || 
|-id=467 bgcolor=#fefefe
| 250467 ||  || — || January 17, 2004 || Kitt Peak || Spacewatch || NYS || align=right data-sort-value="0.80" | 800 m || 
|-id=468 bgcolor=#E9E9E9
| 250468 ||  || — || January 19, 2004 || Anderson Mesa || LONEOS || — || align=right | 1.7 km || 
|-id=469 bgcolor=#fefefe
| 250469 ||  || — || February 10, 2004 || Catalina || CSS || NYS || align=right data-sort-value="0.91" | 910 m || 
|-id=470 bgcolor=#E9E9E9
| 250470 ||  || — || February 12, 2004 || Kitt Peak || Spacewatch || — || align=right | 2.3 km || 
|-id=471 bgcolor=#E9E9E9
| 250471 ||  || — || February 11, 2004 || Palomar || NEAT || ADE || align=right | 2.6 km || 
|-id=472 bgcolor=#E9E9E9
| 250472 ||  || — || February 10, 2004 || Palomar || NEAT || — || align=right | 1.2 km || 
|-id=473 bgcolor=#fefefe
| 250473 ||  || — || February 11, 2004 || Palomar || NEAT || — || align=right | 1.3 km || 
|-id=474 bgcolor=#E9E9E9
| 250474 ||  || — || February 12, 2004 || Palomar || NEAT || — || align=right | 1.4 km || 
|-id=475 bgcolor=#FA8072
| 250475 ||  || — || February 15, 2004 || Catalina || CSS || H || align=right data-sort-value="0.98" | 980 m || 
|-id=476 bgcolor=#fefefe
| 250476 ||  || — || February 18, 2004 || Socorro || LINEAR || H || align=right data-sort-value="0.99" | 990 m || 
|-id=477 bgcolor=#E9E9E9
| 250477 ||  || — || February 17, 2004 || Socorro || LINEAR || — || align=right | 3.3 km || 
|-id=478 bgcolor=#E9E9E9
| 250478 ||  || — || February 18, 2004 || Desert Eagle || W. K. Y. Yeung || — || align=right data-sort-value="0.94" | 940 m || 
|-id=479 bgcolor=#fefefe
| 250479 ||  || — || February 16, 2004 || Socorro || LINEAR || H || align=right data-sort-value="0.87" | 870 m || 
|-id=480 bgcolor=#fefefe
| 250480 ||  || — || February 16, 2004 || Socorro || LINEAR || H || align=right data-sort-value="0.82" | 820 m || 
|-id=481 bgcolor=#E9E9E9
| 250481 ||  || — || February 23, 2004 || Socorro || LINEAR || — || align=right | 3.1 km || 
|-id=482 bgcolor=#E9E9E9
| 250482 ||  || — || February 18, 2004 || Calar Alto || Calar Alto Obs. || MIS || align=right | 3.1 km || 
|-id=483 bgcolor=#E9E9E9
| 250483 ||  || — || March 11, 2004 || Palomar || NEAT || WIT || align=right | 1.3 km || 
|-id=484 bgcolor=#FA8072
| 250484 ||  || — || March 15, 2004 || Catalina || CSS || H || align=right data-sort-value="0.69" | 690 m || 
|-id=485 bgcolor=#E9E9E9
| 250485 ||  || — || March 15, 2004 || Palomar || NEAT || — || align=right | 3.7 km || 
|-id=486 bgcolor=#E9E9E9
| 250486 ||  || — || March 12, 2004 || Palomar || NEAT || HNS || align=right | 1.6 km || 
|-id=487 bgcolor=#E9E9E9
| 250487 ||  || — || March 14, 2004 || Palomar || NEAT || — || align=right | 2.0 km || 
|-id=488 bgcolor=#E9E9E9
| 250488 ||  || — || March 15, 2004 || Catalina || CSS || — || align=right | 1.6 km || 
|-id=489 bgcolor=#E9E9E9
| 250489 ||  || — || March 15, 2004 || Socorro || LINEAR || — || align=right | 2.6 km || 
|-id=490 bgcolor=#E9E9E9
| 250490 ||  || — || March 15, 2004 || Catalina || CSS || — || align=right | 3.0 km || 
|-id=491 bgcolor=#E9E9E9
| 250491 ||  || — || March 14, 2004 || Palomar || NEAT || — || align=right | 2.6 km || 
|-id=492 bgcolor=#fefefe
| 250492 ||  || — || March 17, 2004 || Socorro || LINEAR || H || align=right data-sort-value="0.89" | 890 m || 
|-id=493 bgcolor=#E9E9E9
| 250493 ||  || — || March 16, 2004 || Kitt Peak || Spacewatch || — || align=right | 2.5 km || 
|-id=494 bgcolor=#fefefe
| 250494 ||  || — || March 29, 2004 || Socorro || LINEAR || H || align=right data-sort-value="0.78" | 780 m || 
|-id=495 bgcolor=#E9E9E9
| 250495 ||  || — || March 16, 2004 || Socorro || LINEAR || — || align=right | 3.1 km || 
|-id=496 bgcolor=#E9E9E9
| 250496 ||  || — || March 19, 2004 || Socorro || LINEAR || — || align=right | 2.9 km || 
|-id=497 bgcolor=#E9E9E9
| 250497 ||  || — || March 23, 2004 || Kitt Peak || Spacewatch || AER || align=right | 1.4 km || 
|-id=498 bgcolor=#E9E9E9
| 250498 ||  || — || March 26, 2004 || Kitt Peak || Spacewatch || — || align=right | 2.5 km || 
|-id=499 bgcolor=#E9E9E9
| 250499 ||  || — || March 16, 2004 || Kitt Peak || Spacewatch || — || align=right | 3.7 km || 
|-id=500 bgcolor=#E9E9E9
| 250500 ||  || — || March 18, 2004 || Kitt Peak || Spacewatch || — || align=right | 2.7 km || 
|}

250501–250600 

|-bgcolor=#E9E9E9
| 250501 ||  || — || April 9, 2004 || Siding Spring || SSS || NEM || align=right | 3.5 km || 
|-id=502 bgcolor=#E9E9E9
| 250502 ||  || — || April 11, 2004 || Palomar || NEAT || — || align=right | 3.5 km || 
|-id=503 bgcolor=#E9E9E9
| 250503 ||  || — || April 11, 2004 || Palomar || NEAT || — || align=right | 2.9 km || 
|-id=504 bgcolor=#E9E9E9
| 250504 ||  || — || April 11, 2004 || Catalina || CSS || — || align=right | 5.1 km || 
|-id=505 bgcolor=#E9E9E9
| 250505 ||  || — || April 12, 2004 || Kitt Peak || Spacewatch || — || align=right | 4.4 km || 
|-id=506 bgcolor=#E9E9E9
| 250506 ||  || — || April 12, 2004 || Kitt Peak || Spacewatch || DOR || align=right | 3.0 km || 
|-id=507 bgcolor=#fefefe
| 250507 ||  || — || April 16, 2004 || Socorro || LINEAR || H || align=right data-sort-value="0.76" | 760 m || 
|-id=508 bgcolor=#E9E9E9
| 250508 ||  || — || April 17, 2004 || Siding Spring || SSS || — || align=right | 3.9 km || 
|-id=509 bgcolor=#E9E9E9
| 250509 ||  || — || April 20, 2004 || Socorro || LINEAR || AGN || align=right | 1.9 km || 
|-id=510 bgcolor=#d6d6d6
| 250510 ||  || — || April 16, 2004 || Socorro || LINEAR || — || align=right | 4.2 km || 
|-id=511 bgcolor=#d6d6d6
| 250511 ||  || — || May 15, 2004 || Socorro || LINEAR || — || align=right | 3.7 km || 
|-id=512 bgcolor=#d6d6d6
| 250512 ||  || — || June 11, 2004 || Socorro || LINEAR || — || align=right | 4.4 km || 
|-id=513 bgcolor=#d6d6d6
| 250513 ||  || — || June 22, 2004 || Reedy Creek || J. Broughton || — || align=right | 4.9 km || 
|-id=514 bgcolor=#d6d6d6
| 250514 ||  || — || July 12, 2004 || Palomar || NEAT || — || align=right | 3.1 km || 
|-id=515 bgcolor=#d6d6d6
| 250515 ||  || — || July 10, 2004 || Palomar || NEAT || URS || align=right | 5.3 km || 
|-id=516 bgcolor=#d6d6d6
| 250516 ||  || — || July 15, 2004 || Socorro || LINEAR || — || align=right | 5.1 km || 
|-id=517 bgcolor=#d6d6d6
| 250517 ||  || — || July 10, 2004 || Catalina || CSS || EUP || align=right | 6.9 km || 
|-id=518 bgcolor=#d6d6d6
| 250518 ||  || — || July 11, 2004 || Anderson Mesa || LONEOS || — || align=right | 4.7 km || 
|-id=519 bgcolor=#d6d6d6
| 250519 ||  || — || July 17, 2004 || Socorro || LINEAR || — || align=right | 4.4 km || 
|-id=520 bgcolor=#d6d6d6
| 250520 ||  || — || July 18, 2004 || Siding Spring || SSS || Tj (2.99) || align=right | 6.2 km || 
|-id=521 bgcolor=#d6d6d6
| 250521 ||  || — || August 6, 2004 || Palomar || NEAT || — || align=right | 5.3 km || 
|-id=522 bgcolor=#d6d6d6
| 250522 ||  || — || August 6, 2004 || Palomar || NEAT || — || align=right | 2.9 km || 
|-id=523 bgcolor=#d6d6d6
| 250523 ||  || — || August 8, 2004 || Anderson Mesa || LONEOS || LIX || align=right | 4.8 km || 
|-id=524 bgcolor=#d6d6d6
| 250524 ||  || — || August 9, 2004 || Socorro || LINEAR || — || align=right | 5.5 km || 
|-id=525 bgcolor=#d6d6d6
| 250525 ||  || — || August 9, 2004 || Socorro || LINEAR || TIR || align=right | 2.4 km || 
|-id=526 bgcolor=#d6d6d6
| 250526 Steinerzsuzsanna ||  ||  || August 11, 2004 || Piszkéstető || K. Sárneczky, T. Szalai || — || align=right | 3.4 km || 
|-id=527 bgcolor=#d6d6d6
| 250527 ||  || — || August 8, 2004 || Palomar || NEAT || — || align=right | 5.0 km || 
|-id=528 bgcolor=#d6d6d6
| 250528 ||  || — || August 8, 2004 || Anderson Mesa || LONEOS || — || align=right | 4.4 km || 
|-id=529 bgcolor=#d6d6d6
| 250529 ||  || — || August 8, 2004 || Campo Imperatore || CINEOS || ALA || align=right | 6.5 km || 
|-id=530 bgcolor=#d6d6d6
| 250530 ||  || — || August 9, 2004 || Socorro || LINEAR || — || align=right | 3.9 km || 
|-id=531 bgcolor=#d6d6d6
| 250531 ||  || — || August 12, 2004 || Palomar || NEAT || TIR || align=right | 2.9 km || 
|-id=532 bgcolor=#d6d6d6
| 250532 ||  || — || August 13, 2004 || Palomar || NEAT || — || align=right | 3.5 km || 
|-id=533 bgcolor=#d6d6d6
| 250533 ||  || — || August 11, 2004 || Palomar || NEAT || — || align=right | 4.3 km || 
|-id=534 bgcolor=#d6d6d6
| 250534 ||  || — || August 21, 2004 || Goodricke-Pigott || R. A. Tucker || — || align=right | 4.1 km || 
|-id=535 bgcolor=#d6d6d6
| 250535 ||  || — || August 17, 2004 || Socorro || LINEAR || MEL || align=right | 5.5 km || 
|-id=536 bgcolor=#d6d6d6
| 250536 ||  || — || August 20, 2004 || Siding Spring || SSS || — || align=right | 4.7 km || 
|-id=537 bgcolor=#d6d6d6
| 250537 ||  || — || August 21, 2004 || Catalina || CSS || — || align=right | 7.6 km || 
|-id=538 bgcolor=#d6d6d6
| 250538 ||  || — || August 22, 2004 || Kitt Peak || Spacewatch || — || align=right | 4.1 km || 
|-id=539 bgcolor=#d6d6d6
| 250539 ||  || — || August 25, 2004 || Socorro || LINEAR || EUP || align=right | 4.3 km || 
|-id=540 bgcolor=#d6d6d6
| 250540 ||  || — || August 23, 2004 || Anderson Mesa || LONEOS || — || align=right | 3.3 km || 
|-id=541 bgcolor=#d6d6d6
| 250541 ||  || — || September 5, 2004 || Bergisch Gladbach || W. Bickel || — || align=right | 4.6 km || 
|-id=542 bgcolor=#d6d6d6
| 250542 ||  || — || September 8, 2004 || Socorro || LINEAR || — || align=right | 4.4 km || 
|-id=543 bgcolor=#d6d6d6
| 250543 ||  || — || September 7, 2004 || Kitt Peak || Spacewatch || — || align=right | 5.4 km || 
|-id=544 bgcolor=#d6d6d6
| 250544 ||  || — || September 7, 2004 || Socorro || LINEAR || URS || align=right | 5.5 km || 
|-id=545 bgcolor=#d6d6d6
| 250545 ||  || — || September 8, 2004 || Socorro || LINEAR || fast? || align=right | 4.1 km || 
|-id=546 bgcolor=#d6d6d6
| 250546 ||  || — || September 8, 2004 || Socorro || LINEAR || URS || align=right | 6.2 km || 
|-id=547 bgcolor=#d6d6d6
| 250547 ||  || — || September 9, 2004 || Altschwendt || W. Ries || — || align=right | 5.3 km || 
|-id=548 bgcolor=#d6d6d6
| 250548 ||  || — || September 7, 2004 || Socorro || LINEAR || — || align=right | 5.0 km || 
|-id=549 bgcolor=#d6d6d6
| 250549 ||  || — || September 7, 2004 || Kitt Peak || Spacewatch || — || align=right | 5.4 km || 
|-id=550 bgcolor=#d6d6d6
| 250550 ||  || — || September 8, 2004 || Socorro || LINEAR || — || align=right | 4.7 km || 
|-id=551 bgcolor=#d6d6d6
| 250551 ||  || — || September 7, 2004 || Palomar || NEAT || ALA || align=right | 6.4 km || 
|-id=552 bgcolor=#d6d6d6
| 250552 ||  || — || September 7, 2004 || Palomar || NEAT || — || align=right | 3.5 km || 
|-id=553 bgcolor=#d6d6d6
| 250553 ||  || — || September 8, 2004 || Palomar || NEAT || — || align=right | 3.6 km || 
|-id=554 bgcolor=#d6d6d6
| 250554 ||  || — || September 10, 2004 || Socorro || LINEAR || — || align=right | 5.5 km || 
|-id=555 bgcolor=#d6d6d6
| 250555 ||  || — || September 10, 2004 || Socorro || LINEAR || — || align=right | 5.2 km || 
|-id=556 bgcolor=#d6d6d6
| 250556 ||  || — || September 11, 2004 || Socorro || LINEAR || — || align=right | 3.2 km || 
|-id=557 bgcolor=#d6d6d6
| 250557 ||  || — || September 10, 2004 || Socorro || LINEAR || — || align=right | 5.4 km || 
|-id=558 bgcolor=#d6d6d6
| 250558 ||  || — || September 10, 2004 || Socorro || LINEAR || — || align=right | 6.2 km || 
|-id=559 bgcolor=#d6d6d6
| 250559 ||  || — || September 10, 2004 || Socorro || LINEAR || EUP || align=right | 5.5 km || 
|-id=560 bgcolor=#d6d6d6
| 250560 ||  || — || September 10, 2004 || Socorro || LINEAR || LIX || align=right | 11 km || 
|-id=561 bgcolor=#d6d6d6
| 250561 ||  || — || September 9, 2004 || Socorro || LINEAR || — || align=right | 3.1 km || 
|-id=562 bgcolor=#d6d6d6
| 250562 ||  || — || September 15, 2004 || Socorro || LINEAR || EUP || align=right | 6.8 km || 
|-id=563 bgcolor=#d6d6d6
| 250563 ||  || — || September 12, 2004 || Kitt Peak || Spacewatch || — || align=right | 4.7 km || 
|-id=564 bgcolor=#d6d6d6
| 250564 ||  || — || September 12, 2004 || Kitt Peak || Spacewatch || — || align=right | 3.7 km || 
|-id=565 bgcolor=#d6d6d6
| 250565 ||  || — || September 15, 2004 || Siding Spring || SSS || — || align=right | 2.5 km || 
|-id=566 bgcolor=#d6d6d6
| 250566 ||  || — || September 17, 2004 || Kitt Peak || Spacewatch || — || align=right | 5.4 km || 
|-id=567 bgcolor=#d6d6d6
| 250567 ||  || — || October 4, 2004 || Socorro || LINEAR || LUT || align=right | 7.6 km || 
|-id=568 bgcolor=#d6d6d6
| 250568 ||  || — || October 5, 2004 || Anderson Mesa || LONEOS || — || align=right | 6.5 km || 
|-id=569 bgcolor=#fefefe
| 250569 ||  || — || October 7, 2004 || Kitt Peak || Spacewatch || FLO || align=right | 1.3 km || 
|-id=570 bgcolor=#fefefe
| 250570 ||  || — || October 11, 2004 || Kitt Peak || Spacewatch || — || align=right data-sort-value="0.65" | 650 m || 
|-id=571 bgcolor=#d6d6d6
| 250571 ||  || — || October 11, 2004 || Kitt Peak || Spacewatch || SYL7:4 || align=right | 6.7 km || 
|-id=572 bgcolor=#fefefe
| 250572 ||  || — || November 19, 2004 || Catalina || CSS || — || align=right data-sort-value="0.81" | 810 m || 
|-id=573 bgcolor=#fefefe
| 250573 ||  || — || December 1, 2004 || Catalina || CSS || — || align=right data-sort-value="0.92" | 920 m || 
|-id=574 bgcolor=#fefefe
| 250574 ||  || — || December 12, 2004 || Kitt Peak || Spacewatch || — || align=right data-sort-value="0.91" | 910 m || 
|-id=575 bgcolor=#fefefe
| 250575 ||  || — || December 14, 2004 || Socorro || LINEAR || — || align=right | 1.2 km || 
|-id=576 bgcolor=#d6d6d6
| 250576 ||  || — || December 18, 2004 || Mount Lemmon || Mount Lemmon Survey || HIL3:2 || align=right | 6.4 km || 
|-id=577 bgcolor=#FFC2E0
| 250577 ||  || — || January 1, 2005 || Catalina || CSS || APO +1km || align=right data-sort-value="0.79" | 790 m || 
|-id=578 bgcolor=#fefefe
| 250578 ||  || — || January 6, 2005 || Catalina || CSS || — || align=right | 1.1 km || 
|-id=579 bgcolor=#fefefe
| 250579 ||  || — || January 6, 2005 || Socorro || LINEAR || — || align=right | 1.00 km || 
|-id=580 bgcolor=#fefefe
| 250580 ||  || — || January 6, 2005 || Socorro || LINEAR || FLO || align=right | 1.1 km || 
|-id=581 bgcolor=#fefefe
| 250581 ||  || — || January 11, 2005 || Socorro || LINEAR || — || align=right data-sort-value="0.96" | 960 m || 
|-id=582 bgcolor=#fefefe
| 250582 ||  || — || January 13, 2005 || Socorro || LINEAR || FLO || align=right data-sort-value="0.97" | 970 m || 
|-id=583 bgcolor=#fefefe
| 250583 ||  || — || January 15, 2005 || Socorro || LINEAR || — || align=right data-sort-value="0.80" | 800 m || 
|-id=584 bgcolor=#fefefe
| 250584 ||  || — || January 13, 2005 || Anderson Mesa || LONEOS || — || align=right | 1.7 km || 
|-id=585 bgcolor=#fefefe
| 250585 ||  || — || January 6, 2005 || Catalina || CSS || — || align=right | 1.2 km || 
|-id=586 bgcolor=#fefefe
| 250586 ||  || — || January 16, 2005 || Socorro || LINEAR || — || align=right | 1.3 km || 
|-id=587 bgcolor=#fefefe
| 250587 ||  || — || February 1, 2005 || Kitt Peak || Spacewatch || — || align=right | 2.4 km || 
|-id=588 bgcolor=#fefefe
| 250588 ||  || — || February 2, 2005 || Catalina || CSS || — || align=right | 1.0 km || 
|-id=589 bgcolor=#fefefe
| 250589 ||  || — || February 2, 2005 || Catalina || CSS || — || align=right | 1.3 km || 
|-id=590 bgcolor=#fefefe
| 250590 ||  || — || February 1, 2005 || Kitt Peak || Spacewatch || FLO || align=right data-sort-value="0.90" | 900 m || 
|-id=591 bgcolor=#fefefe
| 250591 ||  || — || February 2, 2005 || Catalina || CSS || — || align=right | 1.1 km || 
|-id=592 bgcolor=#fefefe
| 250592 ||  || — || February 14, 2005 || Catalina || CSS || V || align=right data-sort-value="0.96" | 960 m || 
|-id=593 bgcolor=#fefefe
| 250593 ||  || — || March 2, 2005 || Catalina || CSS || — || align=right | 1.3 km || 
|-id=594 bgcolor=#fefefe
| 250594 ||  || — || March 2, 2005 || Catalina || CSS || FLO || align=right data-sort-value="0.87" | 870 m || 
|-id=595 bgcolor=#fefefe
| 250595 ||  || — || March 3, 2005 || Catalina || CSS || — || align=right | 2.0 km || 
|-id=596 bgcolor=#fefefe
| 250596 ||  || — || March 4, 2005 || Catalina || CSS || NYS || align=right | 2.2 km || 
|-id=597 bgcolor=#E9E9E9
| 250597 ||  || — || March 7, 2005 || Socorro || LINEAR || — || align=right | 1.5 km || 
|-id=598 bgcolor=#fefefe
| 250598 ||  || — || March 4, 2005 || Kitt Peak || Spacewatch || NYS || align=right data-sort-value="0.86" | 860 m || 
|-id=599 bgcolor=#fefefe
| 250599 ||  || — || March 3, 2005 || Catalina || CSS || V || align=right data-sort-value="0.96" | 960 m || 
|-id=600 bgcolor=#fefefe
| 250600 ||  || — || March 9, 2005 || Anderson Mesa || LONEOS || NYS || align=right data-sort-value="0.88" | 880 m || 
|}

250601–250700 

|-bgcolor=#fefefe
| 250601 ||  || — || March 8, 2005 || Socorro || LINEAR || — || align=right | 1.5 km || 
|-id=602 bgcolor=#fefefe
| 250602 ||  || — || March 9, 2005 || Mount Lemmon || Mount Lemmon Survey || — || align=right data-sort-value="0.98" | 980 m || 
|-id=603 bgcolor=#fefefe
| 250603 ||  || — || March 9, 2005 || Mount Lemmon || Mount Lemmon Survey || — || align=right | 1.4 km || 
|-id=604 bgcolor=#fefefe
| 250604 ||  || — || March 8, 2005 || Mount Lemmon || Mount Lemmon Survey || NYS || align=right | 1.0 km || 
|-id=605 bgcolor=#fefefe
| 250605 ||  || — || March 11, 2005 || Mount Lemmon || Mount Lemmon Survey || NYS || align=right data-sort-value="0.86" | 860 m || 
|-id=606 bgcolor=#fefefe
| 250606 Bichat ||  ||  || March 12, 2005 || Saint-Sulpice || B. Christophe || V || align=right data-sort-value="0.74" | 740 m || 
|-id=607 bgcolor=#E9E9E9
| 250607 ||  || — || March 10, 2005 || Mount Lemmon || Mount Lemmon Survey || — || align=right data-sort-value="0.78" | 780 m || 
|-id=608 bgcolor=#fefefe
| 250608 ||  || — || March 12, 2005 || Kitt Peak || Spacewatch || MAS || align=right | 1.0 km || 
|-id=609 bgcolor=#fefefe
| 250609 ||  || — || March 12, 2005 || Kitt Peak || Spacewatch || EUT || align=right data-sort-value="0.85" | 850 m || 
|-id=610 bgcolor=#E9E9E9
| 250610 ||  || — || March 15, 2005 || Mount Lemmon || Mount Lemmon Survey || — || align=right | 1.7 km || 
|-id=611 bgcolor=#E9E9E9
| 250611 ||  || — || March 10, 2005 || Catalina || CSS || — || align=right | 2.8 km || 
|-id=612 bgcolor=#fefefe
| 250612 ||  || — || March 3, 2005 || Kitt Peak || Spacewatch || — || align=right | 1.4 km || 
|-id=613 bgcolor=#fefefe
| 250613 ||  || — || March 30, 2005 || Jarnac || Jarnac Obs. || — || align=right | 1.3 km || 
|-id=614 bgcolor=#FFC2E0
| 250614 ||  || — || April 1, 2005 || Socorro || LINEAR || APO +1km || align=right | 1.6 km || 
|-id=615 bgcolor=#E9E9E9
| 250615 ||  || — || April 1, 2005 || Siding Spring || SSS || BRU || align=right | 3.2 km || 
|-id=616 bgcolor=#E9E9E9
| 250616 ||  || — || April 1, 2005 || Anderson Mesa || LONEOS || — || align=right | 1.5 km || 
|-id=617 bgcolor=#fefefe
| 250617 ||  || — || April 3, 2005 || Socorro || LINEAR || KLI || align=right | 2.7 km || 
|-id=618 bgcolor=#fefefe
| 250618 ||  || — || April 4, 2005 || Mount Lemmon || Mount Lemmon Survey || — || align=right | 1.5 km || 
|-id=619 bgcolor=#E9E9E9
| 250619 ||  || — || April 2, 2005 || Mount Lemmon || Mount Lemmon Survey || JUN || align=right | 1.8 km || 
|-id=620 bgcolor=#FFC2E0
| 250620 ||  || — || April 7, 2005 || Kitt Peak || Spacewatch || APO +1kmPHA || align=right data-sort-value="0.65" | 650 m || 
|-id=621 bgcolor=#E9E9E9
| 250621 ||  || — || April 6, 2005 || Kitt Peak || Spacewatch || — || align=right | 1.1 km || 
|-id=622 bgcolor=#fefefe
| 250622 ||  || — || April 4, 2005 || Kitt Peak || Spacewatch || — || align=right | 1.0 km || 
|-id=623 bgcolor=#fefefe
| 250623 ||  || — || April 6, 2005 || Kitt Peak || Spacewatch || — || align=right | 1.1 km || 
|-id=624 bgcolor=#E9E9E9
| 250624 ||  || — || April 10, 2005 || Mount Lemmon || Mount Lemmon Survey || — || align=right | 1.7 km || 
|-id=625 bgcolor=#E9E9E9
| 250625 ||  || — || April 11, 2005 || Mount Lemmon || Mount Lemmon Survey || — || align=right | 1.9 km || 
|-id=626 bgcolor=#fefefe
| 250626 ||  || — || April 10, 2005 || Kitt Peak || Spacewatch || V || align=right data-sort-value="0.66" | 660 m || 
|-id=627 bgcolor=#fefefe
| 250627 ||  || — || April 10, 2005 || Kitt Peak || Spacewatch || — || align=right | 1.1 km || 
|-id=628 bgcolor=#fefefe
| 250628 ||  || — || April 11, 2005 || Mount Lemmon || Mount Lemmon Survey || MAS || align=right data-sort-value="0.87" | 870 m || 
|-id=629 bgcolor=#E9E9E9
| 250629 ||  || — || April 12, 2005 || Kitt Peak || Spacewatch || — || align=right | 1.7 km || 
|-id=630 bgcolor=#fefefe
| 250630 ||  || — || April 14, 2005 || Catalina || CSS || V || align=right | 1.2 km || 
|-id=631 bgcolor=#E9E9E9
| 250631 ||  || — || April 30, 2005 || Kitt Peak || Spacewatch || JNS || align=right | 2.3 km || 
|-id=632 bgcolor=#fefefe
| 250632 ||  || — || May 4, 2005 || Mauna Kea || C. Veillet || — || align=right | 1.5 km || 
|-id=633 bgcolor=#E9E9E9
| 250633 ||  || — || May 1, 2005 || Palomar || NEAT || — || align=right | 2.4 km || 
|-id=634 bgcolor=#E9E9E9
| 250634 ||  || — || May 3, 2005 || Catalina || CSS || — || align=right | 3.7 km || 
|-id=635 bgcolor=#fefefe
| 250635 ||  || — || May 4, 2005 || Kitt Peak || Spacewatch || — || align=right | 1.2 km || 
|-id=636 bgcolor=#fefefe
| 250636 ||  || — || May 4, 2005 || Anderson Mesa || LONEOS || — || align=right | 1.5 km || 
|-id=637 bgcolor=#fefefe
| 250637 ||  || — || May 3, 2005 || Kitt Peak || Spacewatch || PHO || align=right | 1.8 km || 
|-id=638 bgcolor=#E9E9E9
| 250638 ||  || — || May 8, 2005 || Socorro || LINEAR || — || align=right | 3.1 km || 
|-id=639 bgcolor=#E9E9E9
| 250639 ||  || — || May 9, 2005 || Catalina || CSS || — || align=right | 2.3 km || 
|-id=640 bgcolor=#E9E9E9
| 250640 ||  || — || May 9, 2005 || Socorro || LINEAR || — || align=right | 1.4 km || 
|-id=641 bgcolor=#E9E9E9
| 250641 ||  || — || May 10, 2005 || Kitt Peak || Spacewatch || — || align=right | 1.6 km || 
|-id=642 bgcolor=#E9E9E9
| 250642 ||  || — || May 10, 2005 || Kitt Peak || Spacewatch || — || align=right | 1.4 km || 
|-id=643 bgcolor=#fefefe
| 250643 ||  || — || May 12, 2005 || Palomar || NEAT || — || align=right | 1.2 km || 
|-id=644 bgcolor=#E9E9E9
| 250644 ||  || — || May 12, 2005 || Socorro || LINEAR || GER || align=right | 1.7 km || 
|-id=645 bgcolor=#E9E9E9
| 250645 ||  || — || May 14, 2005 || Kitt Peak || Spacewatch || KON || align=right | 2.3 km || 
|-id=646 bgcolor=#E9E9E9
| 250646 ||  || — || May 14, 2005 || Socorro || LINEAR || — || align=right | 1.6 km || 
|-id=647 bgcolor=#E9E9E9
| 250647 ||  || — || May 14, 2005 || Mount Lemmon || Mount Lemmon Survey || — || align=right | 1.9 km || 
|-id=648 bgcolor=#E9E9E9
| 250648 ||  || — || May 15, 2005 || Palomar || NEAT || MAR || align=right | 1.4 km || 
|-id=649 bgcolor=#E9E9E9
| 250649 ||  || — || May 8, 2005 || Mount Lemmon || Mount Lemmon Survey || RAF || align=right | 1.6 km || 
|-id=650 bgcolor=#fefefe
| 250650 ||  || — || May 13, 2005 || Kitt Peak || Spacewatch || — || align=right | 1.0 km || 
|-id=651 bgcolor=#E9E9E9
| 250651 ||  || — || May 14, 2005 || Socorro || LINEAR || — || align=right | 2.5 km || 
|-id=652 bgcolor=#E9E9E9
| 250652 ||  || — || May 31, 2005 || Catalina || CSS || ADE || align=right | 3.8 km || 
|-id=653 bgcolor=#E9E9E9
| 250653 ||  || — || May 31, 2005 || Catalina || CSS || EUN || align=right | 1.7 km || 
|-id=654 bgcolor=#E9E9E9
| 250654 ||  || — || June 2, 2005 || Siding Spring || SSS || — || align=right | 3.2 km || 
|-id=655 bgcolor=#E9E9E9
| 250655 ||  || — || June 8, 2005 || Kitt Peak || Spacewatch || KON || align=right | 3.2 km || 
|-id=656 bgcolor=#E9E9E9
| 250656 ||  || — || June 13, 2005 || Mount Lemmon || Mount Lemmon Survey || — || align=right | 1.8 km || 
|-id=657 bgcolor=#E9E9E9
| 250657 ||  || — || June 25, 2005 || Palomar || NEAT || — || align=right | 5.0 km || 
|-id=658 bgcolor=#E9E9E9
| 250658 ||  || — || June 27, 2005 || Kitt Peak || Spacewatch || — || align=right | 2.1 km || 
|-id=659 bgcolor=#E9E9E9
| 250659 ||  || — || June 25, 2005 || Palomar || NEAT || — || align=right | 1.9 km || 
|-id=660 bgcolor=#E9E9E9
| 250660 ||  || — || July 1, 2005 || Kitt Peak || Spacewatch || HOF || align=right | 3.2 km || 
|-id=661 bgcolor=#E9E9E9
| 250661 ||  || — || July 1, 2005 || Kitt Peak || Spacewatch || HNA || align=right | 3.4 km || 
|-id=662 bgcolor=#E9E9E9
| 250662 ||  || — || July 1, 2005 || Kitt Peak || Spacewatch || — || align=right | 2.9 km || 
|-id=663 bgcolor=#d6d6d6
| 250663 ||  || — || July 1, 2005 || Kitt Peak || Spacewatch || NAE || align=right | 4.1 km || 
|-id=664 bgcolor=#E9E9E9
| 250664 ||  || — || July 4, 2005 || Kitt Peak || Spacewatch || — || align=right | 3.7 km || 
|-id=665 bgcolor=#E9E9E9
| 250665 ||  || — || July 5, 2005 || Kitt Peak || Spacewatch || — || align=right | 3.2 km || 
|-id=666 bgcolor=#d6d6d6
| 250666 ||  || — || July 11, 2005 || Kitt Peak || Spacewatch || KOR || align=right | 1.5 km || 
|-id=667 bgcolor=#E9E9E9
| 250667 ||  || — || July 3, 2005 || Mount Lemmon || Mount Lemmon Survey || — || align=right | 2.0 km || 
|-id=668 bgcolor=#d6d6d6
| 250668 ||  || — || July 8, 2005 || Kitt Peak || Spacewatch || BRA || align=right | 1.9 km || 
|-id=669 bgcolor=#E9E9E9
| 250669 ||  || — || July 7, 2005 || Mauna Kea || C. Veillet || — || align=right | 1.7 km || 
|-id=670 bgcolor=#E9E9E9
| 250670 ||  || — || July 1, 2005 || Kitt Peak || Spacewatch || — || align=right | 1.7 km || 
|-id=671 bgcolor=#d6d6d6
| 250671 ||  || — || July 30, 2005 || Campo Imperatore || CINEOS || TRP || align=right | 2.7 km || 
|-id=672 bgcolor=#E9E9E9
| 250672 ||  || — || July 28, 2005 || Palomar || NEAT || AST || align=right | 2.2 km || 
|-id=673 bgcolor=#E9E9E9
| 250673 ||  || — || July 31, 2005 || Siding Spring || SSS || — || align=right | 3.5 km || 
|-id=674 bgcolor=#E9E9E9
| 250674 ||  || — || July 29, 2005 || Reedy Creek || J. Broughton || DOR || align=right | 4.9 km || 
|-id=675 bgcolor=#d6d6d6
| 250675 ||  || — || July 31, 2005 || Palomar || NEAT || SAN || align=right | 1.7 km || 
|-id=676 bgcolor=#E9E9E9
| 250676 ||  || — || August 6, 2005 || Reedy Creek || J. Broughton || — || align=right | 2.0 km || 
|-id=677 bgcolor=#d6d6d6
| 250677 ||  || — || August 6, 2005 || Palomar || NEAT || — || align=right | 3.8 km || 
|-id=678 bgcolor=#d6d6d6
| 250678 ||  || — || August 9, 2005 || Cerro Tololo || M. W. Buie || — || align=right | 2.6 km || 
|-id=679 bgcolor=#E9E9E9
| 250679 ||  || — || August 24, 2005 || Palomar || NEAT || GAL || align=right | 2.5 km || 
|-id=680 bgcolor=#FFC2E0
| 250680 ||  || — || August 26, 2005 || Siding Spring || SSS || ATEPHA || align=right data-sort-value="0.4" | 400 m || 
|-id=681 bgcolor=#d6d6d6
| 250681 ||  || — || August 25, 2005 || Palomar || NEAT || — || align=right | 3.0 km || 
|-id=682 bgcolor=#d6d6d6
| 250682 ||  || — || August 25, 2005 || Palomar || NEAT || — || align=right | 3.4 km || 
|-id=683 bgcolor=#E9E9E9
| 250683 ||  || — || August 22, 2005 || Palomar || NEAT || — || align=right | 3.5 km || 
|-id=684 bgcolor=#d6d6d6
| 250684 ||  || — || August 25, 2005 || Palomar || NEAT || KOR || align=right | 2.0 km || 
|-id=685 bgcolor=#E9E9E9
| 250685 ||  || — || August 26, 2005 || Palomar || NEAT || — || align=right | 3.7 km || 
|-id=686 bgcolor=#d6d6d6
| 250686 ||  || — || August 26, 2005 || Palomar || NEAT || EOS || align=right | 2.2 km || 
|-id=687 bgcolor=#d6d6d6
| 250687 ||  || — || August 27, 2005 || Anderson Mesa || LONEOS || — || align=right | 2.6 km || 
|-id=688 bgcolor=#d6d6d6
| 250688 ||  || — || August 27, 2005 || Palomar || NEAT || — || align=right | 2.8 km || 
|-id=689 bgcolor=#d6d6d6
| 250689 ||  || — || August 27, 2005 || Palomar || NEAT || TRE || align=right | 4.9 km || 
|-id=690 bgcolor=#E9E9E9
| 250690 ||  || — || August 27, 2005 || Palomar || NEAT || — || align=right | 3.0 km || 
|-id=691 bgcolor=#d6d6d6
| 250691 ||  || — || August 27, 2005 || Palomar || NEAT || — || align=right | 3.0 km || 
|-id=692 bgcolor=#d6d6d6
| 250692 ||  || — || August 27, 2005 || Palomar || NEAT || EOS || align=right | 2.7 km || 
|-id=693 bgcolor=#E9E9E9
| 250693 ||  || — || August 28, 2005 || Kitt Peak || Spacewatch || HOF || align=right | 2.7 km || 
|-id=694 bgcolor=#d6d6d6
| 250694 ||  || — || August 28, 2005 || Kitt Peak || Spacewatch || KOR || align=right | 1.9 km || 
|-id=695 bgcolor=#d6d6d6
| 250695 ||  || — || August 28, 2005 || Kitt Peak || Spacewatch || — || align=right | 4.3 km || 
|-id=696 bgcolor=#d6d6d6
| 250696 ||  || — || August 30, 2005 || Socorro || LINEAR || — || align=right | 4.3 km || 
|-id=697 bgcolor=#FFC2E0
| 250697 ||  || — || August 31, 2005 || Palomar || NEAT || APO +1km || align=right data-sort-value="0.94" | 940 m || 
|-id=698 bgcolor=#d6d6d6
| 250698 ||  || — || August 29, 2005 || Palomar || NEAT || — || align=right | 4.2 km || 
|-id=699 bgcolor=#d6d6d6
| 250699 ||  || — || August 29, 2005 || Palomar || NEAT || — || align=right | 3.5 km || 
|-id=700 bgcolor=#d6d6d6
| 250700 ||  || — || August 29, 2005 || Palomar || NEAT || EOS || align=right | 2.6 km || 
|}

250701–250800 

|-bgcolor=#d6d6d6
| 250701 ||  || — || August 30, 2005 || Kitt Peak || Spacewatch || KOR || align=right | 1.8 km || 
|-id=702 bgcolor=#d6d6d6
| 250702 ||  || — || August 27, 2005 || Steward || Steward Obs. || KOR || align=right | 1.7 km || 
|-id=703 bgcolor=#d6d6d6
| 250703 ||  || — || August 27, 2005 || Siding Spring || SSS || — || align=right | 2.8 km || 
|-id=704 bgcolor=#d6d6d6
| 250704 ||  || — || August 30, 2005 || Campo Imperatore || CINEOS || — || align=right | 3.4 km || 
|-id=705 bgcolor=#d6d6d6
| 250705 ||  || — || August 30, 2005 || Campo Imperatore || CINEOS || KAR || align=right | 1.4 km || 
|-id=706 bgcolor=#FFC2E0
| 250706 ||  || — || September 4, 2005 || Mauna Kea || D. J. Tholen || APOPHA || align=right data-sort-value="0.54" | 540 m || 
|-id=707 bgcolor=#FA8072
| 250707 ||  || — || September 10, 2005 || Anderson Mesa || LONEOS || H || align=right data-sort-value="0.85" | 850 m || 
|-id=708 bgcolor=#d6d6d6
| 250708 ||  || — || September 9, 2005 || Socorro || LINEAR || — || align=right | 4.2 km || 
|-id=709 bgcolor=#d6d6d6
| 250709 ||  || — || September 12, 2005 || Anderson Mesa || LONEOS || — || align=right | 3.8 km || 
|-id=710 bgcolor=#d6d6d6
| 250710 ||  || — || September 13, 2005 || Kitt Peak || Spacewatch || — || align=right | 3.5 km || 
|-id=711 bgcolor=#d6d6d6
| 250711 ||  || — || September 15, 2005 || Wrightwood || J. W. Young || — || align=right | 4.0 km || 
|-id=712 bgcolor=#d6d6d6
| 250712 ||  || — || September 14, 2005 || Kitt Peak || Spacewatch || EOS || align=right | 4.4 km || 
|-id=713 bgcolor=#d6d6d6
| 250713 ||  || — || September 1, 2005 || Kitt Peak || Spacewatch || EOS || align=right | 2.7 km || 
|-id=714 bgcolor=#d6d6d6
| 250714 ||  || — || September 23, 2005 || Kitt Peak || Spacewatch || — || align=right | 5.4 km || 
|-id=715 bgcolor=#d6d6d6
| 250715 ||  || — || September 24, 2005 || Kitt Peak || Spacewatch || — || align=right | 3.0 km || 
|-id=716 bgcolor=#d6d6d6
| 250716 ||  || — || September 25, 2005 || Catalina || CSS || — || align=right | 2.7 km || 
|-id=717 bgcolor=#d6d6d6
| 250717 ||  || — || September 24, 2005 || Anderson Mesa || LONEOS || — || align=right | 3.0 km || 
|-id=718 bgcolor=#d6d6d6
| 250718 ||  || — || September 23, 2005 || Catalina || CSS || — || align=right | 5.2 km || 
|-id=719 bgcolor=#d6d6d6
| 250719 Jurajbardy ||  ||  || September 23, 2005 || Ondřejov || P. Kušnirák || — || align=right | 4.2 km || 
|-id=720 bgcolor=#d6d6d6
| 250720 ||  || — || September 26, 2005 || Kitt Peak || Spacewatch || BRA || align=right | 2.4 km || 
|-id=721 bgcolor=#d6d6d6
| 250721 ||  || — || September 23, 2005 || Kitt Peak || Spacewatch || CHA || align=right | 3.0 km || 
|-id=722 bgcolor=#d6d6d6
| 250722 ||  || — || September 23, 2005 || Kitt Peak || Spacewatch || — || align=right | 6.6 km || 
|-id=723 bgcolor=#d6d6d6
| 250723 ||  || — || September 23, 2005 || Kitt Peak || Spacewatch || — || align=right | 3.5 km || 
|-id=724 bgcolor=#d6d6d6
| 250724 ||  || — || September 24, 2005 || Kitt Peak || Spacewatch || — || align=right | 2.8 km || 
|-id=725 bgcolor=#d6d6d6
| 250725 ||  || — || September 24, 2005 || Kitt Peak || Spacewatch || — || align=right | 3.7 km || 
|-id=726 bgcolor=#d6d6d6
| 250726 ||  || — || September 24, 2005 || Kitt Peak || Spacewatch || — || align=right | 4.5 km || 
|-id=727 bgcolor=#d6d6d6
| 250727 ||  || — || September 24, 2005 || Kitt Peak || Spacewatch || — || align=right | 3.1 km || 
|-id=728 bgcolor=#d6d6d6
| 250728 ||  || — || September 24, 2005 || Kitt Peak || Spacewatch || EOS || align=right | 3.1 km || 
|-id=729 bgcolor=#d6d6d6
| 250729 ||  || — || September 25, 2005 || Kitt Peak || Spacewatch || — || align=right | 3.8 km || 
|-id=730 bgcolor=#d6d6d6
| 250730 ||  || — || September 26, 2005 || Kitt Peak || Spacewatch || KOR || align=right | 1.7 km || 
|-id=731 bgcolor=#d6d6d6
| 250731 ||  || — || September 26, 2005 || Palomar || NEAT || EOS || align=right | 3.1 km || 
|-id=732 bgcolor=#d6d6d6
| 250732 ||  || — || September 26, 2005 || Palomar || NEAT || EOS || align=right | 2.7 km || 
|-id=733 bgcolor=#d6d6d6
| 250733 ||  || — || September 26, 2005 || Palomar || NEAT || — || align=right | 5.2 km || 
|-id=734 bgcolor=#d6d6d6
| 250734 ||  || — || September 24, 2005 || Kitt Peak || Spacewatch || — || align=right | 2.0 km || 
|-id=735 bgcolor=#d6d6d6
| 250735 ||  || — || September 24, 2005 || Kitt Peak || Spacewatch || KOR || align=right | 2.3 km || 
|-id=736 bgcolor=#d6d6d6
| 250736 ||  || — || September 24, 2005 || Kitt Peak || Spacewatch || — || align=right | 3.4 km || 
|-id=737 bgcolor=#d6d6d6
| 250737 ||  || — || September 24, 2005 || Kitt Peak || Spacewatch || — || align=right | 4.6 km || 
|-id=738 bgcolor=#d6d6d6
| 250738 ||  || — || September 24, 2005 || Kitt Peak || Spacewatch || — || align=right | 3.8 km || 
|-id=739 bgcolor=#d6d6d6
| 250739 ||  || — || September 25, 2005 || Palomar || NEAT || — || align=right | 2.9 km || 
|-id=740 bgcolor=#d6d6d6
| 250740 ||  || — || September 26, 2005 || Kitt Peak || Spacewatch || URS || align=right | 4.9 km || 
|-id=741 bgcolor=#d6d6d6
| 250741 ||  || — || September 27, 2005 || Palomar || NEAT || — || align=right | 5.3 km || 
|-id=742 bgcolor=#d6d6d6
| 250742 ||  || — || September 29, 2005 || Mount Lemmon || Mount Lemmon Survey || VER || align=right | 3.5 km || 
|-id=743 bgcolor=#d6d6d6
| 250743 ||  || — || September 24, 2005 || Kitt Peak || Spacewatch || — || align=right | 4.8 km || 
|-id=744 bgcolor=#d6d6d6
| 250744 ||  || — || September 25, 2005 || Kitt Peak || Spacewatch || — || align=right | 2.7 km || 
|-id=745 bgcolor=#d6d6d6
| 250745 ||  || — || September 26, 2005 || Palomar || NEAT || EOS || align=right | 2.4 km || 
|-id=746 bgcolor=#d6d6d6
| 250746 ||  || — || September 27, 2005 || Palomar || NEAT || — || align=right | 6.3 km || 
|-id=747 bgcolor=#d6d6d6
| 250747 ||  || — || September 29, 2005 || Kitt Peak || Spacewatch || — || align=right | 3.4 km || 
|-id=748 bgcolor=#d6d6d6
| 250748 ||  || — || September 29, 2005 || Kitt Peak || Spacewatch || — || align=right | 4.6 km || 
|-id=749 bgcolor=#d6d6d6
| 250749 ||  || — || September 29, 2005 || Kitt Peak || Spacewatch || — || align=right | 2.9 km || 
|-id=750 bgcolor=#d6d6d6
| 250750 ||  || — || September 29, 2005 || Anderson Mesa || LONEOS || — || align=right | 3.9 km || 
|-id=751 bgcolor=#d6d6d6
| 250751 ||  || — || September 29, 2005 || Mount Lemmon || Mount Lemmon Survey || — || align=right | 3.5 km || 
|-id=752 bgcolor=#d6d6d6
| 250752 ||  || — || September 30, 2005 || Anderson Mesa || LONEOS || — || align=right | 4.0 km || 
|-id=753 bgcolor=#d6d6d6
| 250753 ||  || — || September 30, 2005 || Palomar || NEAT || — || align=right | 3.5 km || 
|-id=754 bgcolor=#d6d6d6
| 250754 ||  || — || September 30, 2005 || Mount Lemmon || Mount Lemmon Survey || — || align=right | 4.1 km || 
|-id=755 bgcolor=#d6d6d6
| 250755 ||  || — || September 30, 2005 || Catalina || CSS || — || align=right | 4.4 km || 
|-id=756 bgcolor=#d6d6d6
| 250756 ||  || — || September 30, 2005 || Anderson Mesa || LONEOS || — || align=right | 3.4 km || 
|-id=757 bgcolor=#d6d6d6
| 250757 ||  || — || September 30, 2005 || Catalina || CSS || — || align=right | 4.4 km || 
|-id=758 bgcolor=#d6d6d6
| 250758 ||  || — || September 30, 2005 || Palomar || NEAT || — || align=right | 2.9 km || 
|-id=759 bgcolor=#d6d6d6
| 250759 ||  || — || September 30, 2005 || Mount Lemmon || Mount Lemmon Survey || — || align=right | 4.2 km || 
|-id=760 bgcolor=#d6d6d6
| 250760 ||  || — || September 29, 2005 || Catalina || CSS || — || align=right | 4.4 km || 
|-id=761 bgcolor=#d6d6d6
| 250761 ||  || — || September 30, 2005 || Mount Lemmon || Mount Lemmon Survey || — || align=right | 2.8 km || 
|-id=762 bgcolor=#fefefe
| 250762 ||  || — || September 30, 2005 || Catalina || CSS || H || align=right | 1.0 km || 
|-id=763 bgcolor=#d6d6d6
| 250763 ||  || — || September 24, 2005 || Palomar || NEAT || EOS || align=right | 2.4 km || 
|-id=764 bgcolor=#d6d6d6
| 250764 ||  || — || September 22, 2005 || Palomar || NEAT || KOR || align=right | 2.0 km || 
|-id=765 bgcolor=#d6d6d6
| 250765 ||  || — || September 25, 2005 || Catalina || CSS || — || align=right | 3.7 km || 
|-id=766 bgcolor=#d6d6d6
| 250766 ||  || — || September 23, 2005 || Kitt Peak || Spacewatch || — || align=right | 2.9 km || 
|-id=767 bgcolor=#d6d6d6
| 250767 ||  || — || September 23, 2005 || Kitt Peak || Spacewatch || — || align=right | 3.8 km || 
|-id=768 bgcolor=#d6d6d6
| 250768 ||  || — || September 29, 2005 || Kitt Peak || Spacewatch || — || align=right | 2.7 km || 
|-id=769 bgcolor=#d6d6d6
| 250769 ||  || — || September 23, 2005 || Kitt Peak || Spacewatch || — || align=right | 4.6 km || 
|-id=770 bgcolor=#d6d6d6
| 250770 ||  || — || October 1, 2005 || Catalina || CSS || — || align=right | 4.5 km || 
|-id=771 bgcolor=#d6d6d6
| 250771 ||  || — || October 1, 2005 || Catalina || CSS || — || align=right | 4.2 km || 
|-id=772 bgcolor=#d6d6d6
| 250772 ||  || — || October 1, 2005 || Catalina || CSS || — || align=right | 3.9 km || 
|-id=773 bgcolor=#d6d6d6
| 250773 ||  || — || October 1, 2005 || Mount Lemmon || Mount Lemmon Survey || — || align=right | 2.9 km || 
|-id=774 bgcolor=#d6d6d6
| 250774 Syosset ||  ||  || October 1, 2005 || Catalina || R. A. Kowalski || — || align=right | 5.7 km || 
|-id=775 bgcolor=#d6d6d6
| 250775 ||  || — || October 1, 2005 || Mount Lemmon || Mount Lemmon Survey || — || align=right | 3.4 km || 
|-id=776 bgcolor=#E9E9E9
| 250776 ||  || — || October 1, 2005 || Kitt Peak || Spacewatch || — || align=right | 1.2 km || 
|-id=777 bgcolor=#d6d6d6
| 250777 ||  || — || October 1, 2005 || Mount Lemmon || Mount Lemmon Survey || — || align=right | 3.9 km || 
|-id=778 bgcolor=#d6d6d6
| 250778 ||  || — || October 1, 2005 || Catalina || CSS || — || align=right | 5.2 km || 
|-id=779 bgcolor=#d6d6d6
| 250779 ||  || — || October 1, 2005 || Kitt Peak || Spacewatch || KOR || align=right | 1.7 km || 
|-id=780 bgcolor=#d6d6d6
| 250780 ||  || — || October 3, 2005 || Catalina || CSS || — || align=right | 5.8 km || 
|-id=781 bgcolor=#d6d6d6
| 250781 ||  || — || October 1, 2005 || Socorro || LINEAR || — || align=right | 2.6 km || 
|-id=782 bgcolor=#d6d6d6
| 250782 ||  || — || October 3, 2005 || Kitt Peak || Spacewatch || 637 || align=right | 3.4 km || 
|-id=783 bgcolor=#d6d6d6
| 250783 ||  || — || October 5, 2005 || Catalina || CSS || — || align=right | 4.3 km || 
|-id=784 bgcolor=#d6d6d6
| 250784 ||  || — || October 7, 2005 || Anderson Mesa || LONEOS || — || align=right | 3.5 km || 
|-id=785 bgcolor=#d6d6d6
| 250785 ||  || — || October 1, 2005 || Kitt Peak || Spacewatch || — || align=right | 3.5 km || 
|-id=786 bgcolor=#d6d6d6
| 250786 ||  || — || October 4, 2005 || Palomar || NEAT || — || align=right | 4.5 km || 
|-id=787 bgcolor=#d6d6d6
| 250787 ||  || — || October 5, 2005 || Catalina || CSS || EUP || align=right | 5.0 km || 
|-id=788 bgcolor=#d6d6d6
| 250788 ||  || — || October 6, 2005 || Catalina || CSS || — || align=right | 3.9 km || 
|-id=789 bgcolor=#d6d6d6
| 250789 ||  || — || October 6, 2005 || Catalina || CSS || — || align=right | 5.7 km || 
|-id=790 bgcolor=#d6d6d6
| 250790 ||  || — || October 4, 2005 || Catalina || CSS || — || align=right | 3.2 km || 
|-id=791 bgcolor=#d6d6d6
| 250791 ||  || — || October 6, 2005 || Catalina || CSS || EOS || align=right | 2.7 km || 
|-id=792 bgcolor=#d6d6d6
| 250792 ||  || — || October 7, 2005 || Catalina || CSS || — || align=right | 5.8 km || 
|-id=793 bgcolor=#d6d6d6
| 250793 ||  || — || October 7, 2005 || Kitt Peak || Spacewatch || KOR || align=right | 1.4 km || 
|-id=794 bgcolor=#d6d6d6
| 250794 ||  || — || October 7, 2005 || Kitt Peak || Spacewatch || — || align=right | 3.3 km || 
|-id=795 bgcolor=#d6d6d6
| 250795 ||  || — || October 7, 2005 || Kitt Peak || Spacewatch || — || align=right | 3.5 km || 
|-id=796 bgcolor=#d6d6d6
| 250796 ||  || — || October 10, 2005 || Catalina || CSS || — || align=right | 2.5 km || 
|-id=797 bgcolor=#d6d6d6
| 250797 ||  || — || October 7, 2005 || Catalina || CSS || — || align=right | 3.5 km || 
|-id=798 bgcolor=#d6d6d6
| 250798 ||  || — || October 9, 2005 || Kitt Peak || Spacewatch || HYG || align=right | 4.2 km || 
|-id=799 bgcolor=#d6d6d6
| 250799 ||  || — || October 1, 2005 || Mount Lemmon || Mount Lemmon Survey || — || align=right | 3.5 km || 
|-id=800 bgcolor=#d6d6d6
| 250800 ||  || — || October 1, 2005 || Kitt Peak || Spacewatch || — || align=right | 3.6 km || 
|}

250801–250900 

|-bgcolor=#d6d6d6
| 250801 ||  || — || October 22, 2005 || Goodricke-Pigott || R. A. Tucker || — || align=right | 6.8 km || 
|-id=802 bgcolor=#d6d6d6
| 250802 ||  || — || October 22, 2005 || Kitt Peak || Spacewatch || — || align=right | 3.6 km || 
|-id=803 bgcolor=#d6d6d6
| 250803 ||  || — || October 22, 2005 || Kitt Peak || Spacewatch || — || align=right | 4.9 km || 
|-id=804 bgcolor=#d6d6d6
| 250804 ||  || — || October 22, 2005 || Kitt Peak || Spacewatch || EOS || align=right | 2.8 km || 
|-id=805 bgcolor=#d6d6d6
| 250805 ||  || — || October 22, 2005 || Kitt Peak || Spacewatch || HYG || align=right | 5.1 km || 
|-id=806 bgcolor=#d6d6d6
| 250806 ||  || — || October 23, 2005 || Catalina || CSS || — || align=right | 5.2 km || 
|-id=807 bgcolor=#d6d6d6
| 250807 ||  || — || October 24, 2005 || Kitt Peak || Spacewatch || — || align=right | 3.3 km || 
|-id=808 bgcolor=#d6d6d6
| 250808 ||  || — || October 24, 2005 || Kitt Peak || Spacewatch || — || align=right | 3.5 km || 
|-id=809 bgcolor=#d6d6d6
| 250809 ||  || — || October 24, 2005 || Kitt Peak || Spacewatch || HYG || align=right | 4.2 km || 
|-id=810 bgcolor=#d6d6d6
| 250810 ||  || — || October 23, 2005 || Catalina || CSS || — || align=right | 4.8 km || 
|-id=811 bgcolor=#d6d6d6
| 250811 ||  || — || October 23, 2005 || Catalina || CSS || — || align=right | 3.1 km || 
|-id=812 bgcolor=#d6d6d6
| 250812 ||  || — || October 23, 2005 || Catalina || CSS || — || align=right | 3.8 km || 
|-id=813 bgcolor=#d6d6d6
| 250813 ||  || — || October 23, 2005 || Catalina || CSS || LIX || align=right | 5.1 km || 
|-id=814 bgcolor=#d6d6d6
| 250814 ||  || — || October 23, 2005 || Catalina || CSS || HYG || align=right | 3.8 km || 
|-id=815 bgcolor=#d6d6d6
| 250815 ||  || — || October 24, 2005 || Kitt Peak || Spacewatch || VER || align=right | 5.5 km || 
|-id=816 bgcolor=#d6d6d6
| 250816 ||  || — || October 24, 2005 || Kitt Peak || Spacewatch || HYG || align=right | 4.6 km || 
|-id=817 bgcolor=#d6d6d6
| 250817 ||  || — || October 24, 2005 || Kitt Peak || Spacewatch || — || align=right | 5.3 km || 
|-id=818 bgcolor=#d6d6d6
| 250818 ||  || — || October 22, 2005 || Palomar || NEAT || — || align=right | 4.1 km || 
|-id=819 bgcolor=#d6d6d6
| 250819 ||  || — || October 22, 2005 || Palomar || NEAT || — || align=right | 2.7 km || 
|-id=820 bgcolor=#d6d6d6
| 250820 ||  || — || October 23, 2005 || Palomar || NEAT || — || align=right | 5.3 km || 
|-id=821 bgcolor=#d6d6d6
| 250821 ||  || — || October 23, 2005 || Palomar || NEAT || — || align=right | 5.0 km || 
|-id=822 bgcolor=#d6d6d6
| 250822 ||  || — || October 23, 2005 || Palomar || NEAT || EOS || align=right | 3.0 km || 
|-id=823 bgcolor=#d6d6d6
| 250823 ||  || — || October 23, 2005 || Catalina || CSS || — || align=right | 2.3 km || 
|-id=824 bgcolor=#d6d6d6
| 250824 ||  || — || October 23, 2005 || Catalina || CSS || — || align=right | 4.4 km || 
|-id=825 bgcolor=#d6d6d6
| 250825 ||  || — || October 23, 2005 || Palomar || NEAT || — || align=right | 3.5 km || 
|-id=826 bgcolor=#d6d6d6
| 250826 ||  || — || October 23, 2005 || Palomar || NEAT || — || align=right | 3.2 km || 
|-id=827 bgcolor=#d6d6d6
| 250827 ||  || — || October 23, 2005 || Palomar || NEAT || — || align=right | 4.2 km || 
|-id=828 bgcolor=#d6d6d6
| 250828 ||  || — || October 24, 2005 || Palomar || NEAT || — || align=right | 4.4 km || 
|-id=829 bgcolor=#d6d6d6
| 250829 ||  || — || October 22, 2005 || Kitt Peak || Spacewatch || — || align=right | 3.7 km || 
|-id=830 bgcolor=#d6d6d6
| 250830 ||  || — || October 22, 2005 || Kitt Peak || Spacewatch || — || align=right | 2.6 km || 
|-id=831 bgcolor=#d6d6d6
| 250831 ||  || — || October 22, 2005 || Kitt Peak || Spacewatch || THM || align=right | 2.9 km || 
|-id=832 bgcolor=#d6d6d6
| 250832 ||  || — || October 24, 2005 || Kitt Peak || Spacewatch || — || align=right | 3.0 km || 
|-id=833 bgcolor=#d6d6d6
| 250833 ||  || — || October 24, 2005 || Palomar || NEAT || — || align=right | 3.6 km || 
|-id=834 bgcolor=#d6d6d6
| 250834 ||  || — || October 25, 2005 || Mount Lemmon || Mount Lemmon Survey || — || align=right | 2.7 km || 
|-id=835 bgcolor=#d6d6d6
| 250835 ||  || — || October 25, 2005 || Mount Lemmon || Mount Lemmon Survey || — || align=right | 2.9 km || 
|-id=836 bgcolor=#d6d6d6
| 250836 ||  || — || October 25, 2005 || Catalina || CSS || — || align=right | 5.6 km || 
|-id=837 bgcolor=#d6d6d6
| 250837 ||  || — || October 26, 2005 || Kitt Peak || Spacewatch || — || align=right | 2.5 km || 
|-id=838 bgcolor=#d6d6d6
| 250838 ||  || — || October 26, 2005 || Anderson Mesa || LONEOS || — || align=right | 4.4 km || 
|-id=839 bgcolor=#d6d6d6
| 250839 ||  || — || October 26, 2005 || Kitt Peak || Spacewatch || — || align=right | 3.5 km || 
|-id=840 bgcolor=#d6d6d6
| 250840 Motörhead ||  ||  || October 30, 2005 || Nogales || J.-C. Merlin || HYG || align=right | 3.2 km || 
|-id=841 bgcolor=#d6d6d6
| 250841 ||  || — || October 23, 2005 || Kitt Peak || Spacewatch || — || align=right | 4.9 km || 
|-id=842 bgcolor=#d6d6d6
| 250842 ||  || — || October 24, 2005 || Kitt Peak || Spacewatch || HYG || align=right | 4.1 km || 
|-id=843 bgcolor=#d6d6d6
| 250843 ||  || — || October 24, 2005 || Kitt Peak || Spacewatch || HYG || align=right | 5.1 km || 
|-id=844 bgcolor=#d6d6d6
| 250844 ||  || — || October 24, 2005 || Kitt Peak || Spacewatch || — || align=right | 4.9 km || 
|-id=845 bgcolor=#d6d6d6
| 250845 ||  || — || October 27, 2005 || Mount Lemmon || Mount Lemmon Survey || — || align=right | 4.9 km || 
|-id=846 bgcolor=#d6d6d6
| 250846 ||  || — || October 24, 2005 || Kitt Peak || Spacewatch || THM || align=right | 2.9 km || 
|-id=847 bgcolor=#d6d6d6
| 250847 ||  || — || October 24, 2005 || Kitt Peak || Spacewatch || — || align=right | 5.2 km || 
|-id=848 bgcolor=#d6d6d6
| 250848 ||  || — || October 25, 2005 || Mount Lemmon || Mount Lemmon Survey || — || align=right | 2.9 km || 
|-id=849 bgcolor=#d6d6d6
| 250849 ||  || — || October 25, 2005 || Kitt Peak || Spacewatch || EOS || align=right | 2.8 km || 
|-id=850 bgcolor=#d6d6d6
| 250850 ||  || — || October 26, 2005 || Kitt Peak || Spacewatch || — || align=right | 4.2 km || 
|-id=851 bgcolor=#d6d6d6
| 250851 ||  || — || October 25, 2005 || Kitt Peak || Spacewatch || — || align=right | 3.7 km || 
|-id=852 bgcolor=#d6d6d6
| 250852 ||  || — || October 25, 2005 || Kitt Peak || Spacewatch || HYG || align=right | 3.3 km || 
|-id=853 bgcolor=#d6d6d6
| 250853 ||  || — || October 28, 2005 || Mount Lemmon || Mount Lemmon Survey || 7:4 || align=right | 3.4 km || 
|-id=854 bgcolor=#d6d6d6
| 250854 ||  || — || October 25, 2005 || Kitt Peak || Spacewatch || — || align=right | 5.1 km || 
|-id=855 bgcolor=#d6d6d6
| 250855 ||  || — || October 27, 2005 || Kitt Peak || Spacewatch || — || align=right | 5.7 km || 
|-id=856 bgcolor=#d6d6d6
| 250856 ||  || — || October 24, 2005 || Palomar || NEAT || — || align=right | 6.1 km || 
|-id=857 bgcolor=#d6d6d6
| 250857 ||  || — || October 26, 2005 || Kitt Peak || Spacewatch || — || align=right | 6.0 km || 
|-id=858 bgcolor=#d6d6d6
| 250858 ||  || — || October 26, 2005 || Kitt Peak || Spacewatch || — || align=right | 4.4 km || 
|-id=859 bgcolor=#d6d6d6
| 250859 ||  || — || October 26, 2005 || Kitt Peak || Spacewatch || — || align=right | 6.2 km || 
|-id=860 bgcolor=#d6d6d6
| 250860 ||  || — || October 24, 2005 || Kitt Peak || Spacewatch || — || align=right | 5.7 km || 
|-id=861 bgcolor=#d6d6d6
| 250861 ||  || — || October 25, 2005 || Kitt Peak || Spacewatch || — || align=right | 4.0 km || 
|-id=862 bgcolor=#d6d6d6
| 250862 ||  || — || October 27, 2005 || Kitt Peak || Spacewatch || — || align=right | 4.1 km || 
|-id=863 bgcolor=#d6d6d6
| 250863 ||  || — || October 28, 2005 || Mount Lemmon || Mount Lemmon Survey || — || align=right | 2.7 km || 
|-id=864 bgcolor=#d6d6d6
| 250864 ||  || — || October 31, 2005 || Kitt Peak || Spacewatch || — || align=right | 4.1 km || 
|-id=865 bgcolor=#d6d6d6
| 250865 ||  || — || October 23, 2005 || Catalina || CSS || — || align=right | 4.8 km || 
|-id=866 bgcolor=#d6d6d6
| 250866 ||  || — || October 29, 2005 || Catalina || CSS || — || align=right | 3.0 km || 
|-id=867 bgcolor=#d6d6d6
| 250867 ||  || — || October 25, 2005 || Socorro || LINEAR || EUP || align=right | 6.1 km || 
|-id=868 bgcolor=#d6d6d6
| 250868 ||  || — || October 27, 2005 || Anderson Mesa || LONEOS || — || align=right | 3.7 km || 
|-id=869 bgcolor=#d6d6d6
| 250869 ||  || — || October 26, 2005 || Kitt Peak || Spacewatch || — || align=right | 4.8 km || 
|-id=870 bgcolor=#d6d6d6
| 250870 ||  || — || October 31, 2005 || Mount Lemmon || Mount Lemmon Survey || THM || align=right | 2.6 km || 
|-id=871 bgcolor=#d6d6d6
| 250871 ||  || — || October 28, 2005 || Kitt Peak || Spacewatch || HYG || align=right | 3.5 km || 
|-id=872 bgcolor=#d6d6d6
| 250872 ||  || — || October 29, 2005 || Catalina || CSS || — || align=right | 2.5 km || 
|-id=873 bgcolor=#d6d6d6
| 250873 ||  || — || October 29, 2005 || Catalina || CSS || EOS || align=right | 3.4 km || 
|-id=874 bgcolor=#d6d6d6
| 250874 ||  || — || October 30, 2005 || Mount Lemmon || Mount Lemmon Survey || — || align=right | 3.1 km || 
|-id=875 bgcolor=#d6d6d6
| 250875 ||  || — || October 23, 2005 || Catalina || CSS || — || align=right | 3.0 km || 
|-id=876 bgcolor=#d6d6d6
| 250876 ||  || — || October 27, 2005 || Anderson Mesa || LONEOS || URS || align=right | 5.2 km || 
|-id=877 bgcolor=#d6d6d6
| 250877 ||  || — || October 29, 2005 || Kitt Peak || Spacewatch || — || align=right | 3.5 km || 
|-id=878 bgcolor=#d6d6d6
| 250878 ||  || — || October 30, 2005 || Catalina || CSS || — || align=right | 6.4 km || 
|-id=879 bgcolor=#d6d6d6
| 250879 ||  || — || October 30, 2005 || Catalina || CSS || — || align=right | 2.2 km || 
|-id=880 bgcolor=#d6d6d6
| 250880 ||  || — || October 23, 2005 || Catalina || CSS || EOS || align=right | 3.1 km || 
|-id=881 bgcolor=#d6d6d6
| 250881 ||  || — || October 23, 2005 || Catalina || CSS || EOS || align=right | 3.5 km || 
|-id=882 bgcolor=#d6d6d6
| 250882 ||  || — || October 23, 2005 || Catalina || CSS || ALA || align=right | 5.8 km || 
|-id=883 bgcolor=#d6d6d6
| 250883 ||  || — || October 28, 2005 || Catalina || CSS || EOS || align=right | 4.6 km || 
|-id=884 bgcolor=#d6d6d6
| 250884 ||  || — || October 29, 2005 || Catalina || CSS || — || align=right | 4.0 km || 
|-id=885 bgcolor=#d6d6d6
| 250885 ||  || — || October 23, 2005 || Catalina || CSS || — || align=right | 4.5 km || 
|-id=886 bgcolor=#d6d6d6
| 250886 ||  || — || October 22, 2005 || Apache Point || A. C. Becker || — || align=right | 4.6 km || 
|-id=887 bgcolor=#d6d6d6
| 250887 ||  || — || October 25, 2005 || Apache Point || A. C. Becker || — || align=right | 4.8 km || 
|-id=888 bgcolor=#d6d6d6
| 250888 ||  || — || November 4, 2005 || Kitt Peak || Spacewatch || LIX || align=right | 4.4 km || 
|-id=889 bgcolor=#d6d6d6
| 250889 ||  || — || November 4, 2005 || Kitt Peak || Spacewatch || — || align=right | 3.4 km || 
|-id=890 bgcolor=#d6d6d6
| 250890 ||  || — || November 3, 2005 || Socorro || LINEAR || — || align=right | 3.4 km || 
|-id=891 bgcolor=#d6d6d6
| 250891 ||  || — || November 3, 2005 || Socorro || LINEAR || URS || align=right | 4.9 km || 
|-id=892 bgcolor=#d6d6d6
| 250892 ||  || — || November 5, 2005 || Kitt Peak || Spacewatch || EOS || align=right | 6.2 km || 
|-id=893 bgcolor=#d6d6d6
| 250893 ||  || — || November 5, 2005 || Socorro || LINEAR || — || align=right | 5.8 km || 
|-id=894 bgcolor=#d6d6d6
| 250894 ||  || — || November 1, 2005 || Mount Lemmon || Mount Lemmon Survey || THM || align=right | 3.7 km || 
|-id=895 bgcolor=#d6d6d6
| 250895 ||  || — || November 2, 2005 || Socorro || LINEAR || — || align=right | 4.9 km || 
|-id=896 bgcolor=#d6d6d6
| 250896 ||  || — || November 5, 2005 || Kitt Peak || Spacewatch || HYG || align=right | 4.7 km || 
|-id=897 bgcolor=#d6d6d6
| 250897 ||  || — || November 5, 2005 || Socorro || LINEAR || — || align=right | 5.5 km || 
|-id=898 bgcolor=#d6d6d6
| 250898 ||  || — || November 13, 2005 || Socorro || LINEAR || EUP || align=right | 5.4 km || 
|-id=899 bgcolor=#d6d6d6
| 250899 ||  || — || November 5, 2005 || Kitt Peak || Spacewatch || — || align=right | 3.7 km || 
|-id=900 bgcolor=#d6d6d6
| 250900 ||  || — || November 5, 2005 || Catalina || CSS || — || align=right | 5.6 km || 
|}

250901–251000 

|-bgcolor=#d6d6d6
| 250901 ||  || — || November 1, 2005 || Socorro || LINEAR || — || align=right | 3.1 km || 
|-id=902 bgcolor=#d6d6d6
| 250902 ||  || — || November 2, 2005 || Catalina || CSS || — || align=right | 5.4 km || 
|-id=903 bgcolor=#d6d6d6
| 250903 ||  || — || November 2, 2005 || Socorro || LINEAR || — || align=right | 6.0 km || 
|-id=904 bgcolor=#d6d6d6
| 250904 ||  || — || November 6, 2005 || Mount Lemmon || Mount Lemmon Survey || — || align=right | 3.1 km || 
|-id=905 bgcolor=#d6d6d6
| 250905 ||  || — || November 1, 2005 || Apache Point || A. C. Becker || — || align=right | 4.5 km || 
|-id=906 bgcolor=#d6d6d6
| 250906 ||  || — || November 10, 2005 || Catalina || CSS || — || align=right | 5.4 km || 
|-id=907 bgcolor=#d6d6d6
| 250907 ||  || — || November 19, 2005 || Wrightwood || J. W. Young || — || align=right | 2.6 km || 
|-id=908 bgcolor=#d6d6d6
| 250908 ||  || — || November 22, 2005 || Socorro || LINEAR || — || align=right | 5.3 km || 
|-id=909 bgcolor=#d6d6d6
| 250909 ||  || — || November 22, 2005 || Socorro || LINEAR || — || align=right | 4.7 km || 
|-id=910 bgcolor=#d6d6d6
| 250910 ||  || — || November 21, 2005 || Catalina || CSS || — || align=right | 2.6 km || 
|-id=911 bgcolor=#d6d6d6
| 250911 ||  || — || November 21, 2005 || Anderson Mesa || LONEOS || EOS || align=right | 3.2 km || 
|-id=912 bgcolor=#d6d6d6
| 250912 ||  || — || November 21, 2005 || Catalina || CSS || — || align=right | 5.1 km || 
|-id=913 bgcolor=#d6d6d6
| 250913 ||  || — || November 21, 2005 || Catalina || CSS || THM || align=right | 2.9 km || 
|-id=914 bgcolor=#d6d6d6
| 250914 ||  || — || November 21, 2005 || Catalina || CSS || THM || align=right | 3.1 km || 
|-id=915 bgcolor=#d6d6d6
| 250915 ||  || — || November 21, 2005 || Kitt Peak || Spacewatch || EOS || align=right | 3.6 km || 
|-id=916 bgcolor=#d6d6d6
| 250916 ||  || — || November 21, 2005 || Kitt Peak || Spacewatch || THM || align=right | 2.9 km || 
|-id=917 bgcolor=#d6d6d6
| 250917 ||  || — || November 22, 2005 || Kitt Peak || Spacewatch || — || align=right | 4.5 km || 
|-id=918 bgcolor=#d6d6d6
| 250918 ||  || — || November 22, 2005 || Kitt Peak || Spacewatch || — || align=right | 3.5 km || 
|-id=919 bgcolor=#d6d6d6
| 250919 ||  || — || November 21, 2005 || Kitt Peak || Spacewatch || — || align=right | 4.2 km || 
|-id=920 bgcolor=#d6d6d6
| 250920 ||  || — || November 21, 2005 || Kitt Peak || Spacewatch || — || align=right | 4.9 km || 
|-id=921 bgcolor=#d6d6d6
| 250921 ||  || — || November 21, 2005 || Catalina || CSS || — || align=right | 4.8 km || 
|-id=922 bgcolor=#d6d6d6
| 250922 ||  || — || November 25, 2005 || Kitt Peak || Spacewatch || — || align=right | 4.0 km || 
|-id=923 bgcolor=#d6d6d6
| 250923 ||  || — || November 25, 2005 || Kitt Peak || Spacewatch || — || align=right | 5.4 km || 
|-id=924 bgcolor=#d6d6d6
| 250924 ||  || — || November 22, 2005 || Catalina || CSS || — || align=right | 3.9 km || 
|-id=925 bgcolor=#d6d6d6
| 250925 ||  || — || November 25, 2005 || Catalina || CSS || — || align=right | 5.2 km || 
|-id=926 bgcolor=#d6d6d6
| 250926 ||  || — || November 26, 2005 || Catalina || CSS || THB || align=right | 3.7 km || 
|-id=927 bgcolor=#d6d6d6
| 250927 ||  || — || November 29, 2005 || Socorro || LINEAR || — || align=right | 3.0 km || 
|-id=928 bgcolor=#d6d6d6
| 250928 ||  || — || November 28, 2005 || Catalina || CSS || — || align=right | 4.9 km || 
|-id=929 bgcolor=#d6d6d6
| 250929 ||  || — || November 28, 2005 || Socorro || LINEAR || — || align=right | 7.1 km || 
|-id=930 bgcolor=#d6d6d6
| 250930 ||  || — || November 28, 2005 || Catalina || CSS || — || align=right | 5.6 km || 
|-id=931 bgcolor=#fefefe
| 250931 ||  || — || November 30, 2005 || Mount Lemmon || Mount Lemmon Survey || H || align=right data-sort-value="0.87" | 870 m || 
|-id=932 bgcolor=#d6d6d6
| 250932 ||  || — || November 25, 2005 || Catalina || CSS || — || align=right | 4.5 km || 
|-id=933 bgcolor=#d6d6d6
| 250933 ||  || — || November 28, 2005 || Catalina || CSS || — || align=right | 3.2 km || 
|-id=934 bgcolor=#d6d6d6
| 250934 ||  || — || November 25, 2005 || Catalina || CSS || — || align=right | 4.7 km || 
|-id=935 bgcolor=#d6d6d6
| 250935 ||  || — || November 30, 2005 || Anderson Mesa || LONEOS || EUP || align=right | 6.4 km || 
|-id=936 bgcolor=#d6d6d6
| 250936 ||  || — || December 1, 2005 || Socorro || LINEAR || THM || align=right | 3.2 km || 
|-id=937 bgcolor=#d6d6d6
| 250937 ||  || — || December 2, 2005 || Socorro || LINEAR || HYG || align=right | 3.8 km || 
|-id=938 bgcolor=#d6d6d6
| 250938 ||  || — || December 2, 2005 || Kitt Peak || Spacewatch || — || align=right | 3.9 km || 
|-id=939 bgcolor=#d6d6d6
| 250939 ||  || — || December 7, 2005 || Catalina || CSS || — || align=right | 4.3 km || 
|-id=940 bgcolor=#d6d6d6
| 250940 ||  || — || December 9, 2005 || Socorro || LINEAR || THM || align=right | 3.6 km || 
|-id=941 bgcolor=#d6d6d6
| 250941 ||  || — || December 10, 2005 || Catalina || CSS || — || align=right | 6.7 km || 
|-id=942 bgcolor=#d6d6d6
| 250942 ||  || — || December 24, 2005 || Socorro || LINEAR || — || align=right | 6.2 km || 
|-id=943 bgcolor=#d6d6d6
| 250943 ||  || — || December 26, 2005 || Kitt Peak || Spacewatch || — || align=right | 4.1 km || 
|-id=944 bgcolor=#fefefe
| 250944 ||  || — || December 27, 2005 || Catalina || CSS || H || align=right data-sort-value="0.71" | 710 m || 
|-id=945 bgcolor=#d6d6d6
| 250945 ||  || — || December 30, 2005 || Catalina || CSS || THB || align=right | 4.3 km || 
|-id=946 bgcolor=#d6d6d6
| 250946 ||  || — || December 26, 2005 || Mount Lemmon || Mount Lemmon Survey || THM || align=right | 2.6 km || 
|-id=947 bgcolor=#d6d6d6
| 250947 ||  || — || December 28, 2005 || Junk Bond || D. Healy || — || align=right | 6.5 km || 
|-id=948 bgcolor=#d6d6d6
| 250948 ||  || — || January 24, 2006 || Socorro || LINEAR || — || align=right | 4.8 km || 
|-id=949 bgcolor=#fefefe
| 250949 ||  || — || January 27, 2006 || Mayhill || A. Lowe || H || align=right data-sort-value="0.60" | 600 m || 
|-id=950 bgcolor=#fefefe
| 250950 ||  || — || January 26, 2006 || Kitt Peak || Spacewatch || — || align=right data-sort-value="0.72" | 720 m || 
|-id=951 bgcolor=#fefefe
| 250951 ||  || — || January 31, 2006 || Kitt Peak || Spacewatch || MAS || align=right data-sort-value="0.84" | 840 m || 
|-id=952 bgcolor=#d6d6d6
| 250952 ||  || — || January 26, 2006 || Anderson Mesa || LONEOS || — || align=right | 3.5 km || 
|-id=953 bgcolor=#fefefe
| 250953 ||  || — || January 31, 2006 || Mount Lemmon || Mount Lemmon Survey || — || align=right | 1.1 km || 
|-id=954 bgcolor=#fefefe
| 250954 ||  || — || February 1, 2006 || Mount Lemmon || Mount Lemmon Survey || — || align=right | 1.1 km || 
|-id=955 bgcolor=#d6d6d6
| 250955 ||  || — || February 3, 2006 || Mount Lemmon || Mount Lemmon Survey || 7:4 || align=right | 4.9 km || 
|-id=956 bgcolor=#fefefe
| 250956 ||  || — || February 20, 2006 || Catalina || CSS || — || align=right data-sort-value="0.95" | 950 m || 
|-id=957 bgcolor=#fefefe
| 250957 ||  || — || February 22, 2006 || Catalina || CSS || PHO || align=right | 1.3 km || 
|-id=958 bgcolor=#fefefe
| 250958 ||  || — || February 23, 2006 || Anderson Mesa || LONEOS || — || align=right | 1.2 km || 
|-id=959 bgcolor=#fefefe
| 250959 ||  || — || February 20, 2006 || Mount Lemmon || Mount Lemmon Survey || FLO || align=right data-sort-value="0.64" | 640 m || 
|-id=960 bgcolor=#fefefe
| 250960 ||  || — || February 24, 2006 || Kitt Peak || Spacewatch || — || align=right data-sort-value="0.88" | 880 m || 
|-id=961 bgcolor=#fefefe
| 250961 ||  || — || February 24, 2006 || Kitt Peak || Spacewatch || FLO || align=right data-sort-value="0.73" | 730 m || 
|-id=962 bgcolor=#d6d6d6
| 250962 ||  || — || February 25, 2006 || Kitt Peak || Spacewatch || 3:2 || align=right | 7.0 km || 
|-id=963 bgcolor=#fefefe
| 250963 ||  || — || February 27, 2006 || Kitt Peak || Spacewatch || FLO || align=right data-sort-value="0.73" | 730 m || 
|-id=964 bgcolor=#fefefe
| 250964 ||  || — || February 24, 2006 || Catalina || CSS || — || align=right | 1.1 km || 
|-id=965 bgcolor=#fefefe
| 250965 ||  || — || March 4, 2006 || Catalina || CSS || — || align=right | 1.00 km || 
|-id=966 bgcolor=#fefefe
| 250966 ||  || — || March 23, 2006 || Kitt Peak || Spacewatch || FLO || align=right data-sort-value="0.94" | 940 m || 
|-id=967 bgcolor=#fefefe
| 250967 ||  || — || March 24, 2006 || Socorro || LINEAR || — || align=right data-sort-value="0.87" | 870 m || 
|-id=968 bgcolor=#FA8072
| 250968 ||  || — || April 2, 2006 || Kitt Peak || Spacewatch || — || align=right | 1.2 km || 
|-id=969 bgcolor=#fefefe
| 250969 ||  || — || April 20, 2006 || Kitt Peak || Spacewatch || — || align=right data-sort-value="0.97" | 970 m || 
|-id=970 bgcolor=#fefefe
| 250970 ||  || — || April 19, 2006 || Catalina || CSS || — || align=right data-sort-value="0.92" | 920 m || 
|-id=971 bgcolor=#fefefe
| 250971 ||  || — || April 21, 2006 || Socorro || LINEAR || — || align=right | 1.2 km || 
|-id=972 bgcolor=#fefefe
| 250972 ||  || — || April 25, 2006 || Catalina || CSS || PHO || align=right | 1.2 km || 
|-id=973 bgcolor=#fefefe
| 250973 ||  || — || April 25, 2006 || Kitt Peak || Spacewatch || — || align=right data-sort-value="0.75" | 750 m || 
|-id=974 bgcolor=#fefefe
| 250974 ||  || — || April 26, 2006 || Kitt Peak || Spacewatch || — || align=right data-sort-value="0.81" | 810 m || 
|-id=975 bgcolor=#fefefe
| 250975 ||  || — || April 29, 2006 || Kitt Peak || Spacewatch || — || align=right data-sort-value="0.87" | 870 m || 
|-id=976 bgcolor=#fefefe
| 250976 ||  || — || April 30, 2006 || Kitt Peak || Spacewatch || NYS || align=right | 1.4 km || 
|-id=977 bgcolor=#fefefe
| 250977 ||  || — || April 29, 2006 || Siding Spring || SSS || — || align=right | 1.2 km || 
|-id=978 bgcolor=#fefefe
| 250978 ||  || — || May 5, 2006 || Mount Lemmon || Mount Lemmon Survey || — || align=right | 1.0 km || 
|-id=979 bgcolor=#fefefe
| 250979 ||  || — || May 3, 2006 || Kitt Peak || Spacewatch || — || align=right | 1.0 km || 
|-id=980 bgcolor=#fefefe
| 250980 ||  || — || May 4, 2006 || Kitt Peak || Spacewatch || — || align=right data-sort-value="0.89" | 890 m || 
|-id=981 bgcolor=#fefefe
| 250981 ||  || — || May 10, 2006 || Palomar || NEAT || — || align=right | 1.3 km || 
|-id=982 bgcolor=#fefefe
| 250982 ||  || — || May 8, 2006 || Siding Spring || SSS || — || align=right | 1.3 km || 
|-id=983 bgcolor=#fefefe
| 250983 ||  || — || May 18, 2006 || Palomar || NEAT || — || align=right | 1.5 km || 
|-id=984 bgcolor=#fefefe
| 250984 ||  || — || May 20, 2006 || Catalina || CSS || — || align=right data-sort-value="0.95" | 950 m || 
|-id=985 bgcolor=#fefefe
| 250985 ||  || — || May 22, 2006 || Mount Lemmon || Mount Lemmon Survey || — || align=right data-sort-value="0.78" | 780 m || 
|-id=986 bgcolor=#fefefe
| 250986 ||  || — || May 20, 2006 || Catalina || CSS || — || align=right | 1.3 km || 
|-id=987 bgcolor=#fefefe
| 250987 ||  || — || May 20, 2006 || Kitt Peak || Spacewatch || — || align=right | 1.1 km || 
|-id=988 bgcolor=#fefefe
| 250988 ||  || — || May 20, 2006 || Kitt Peak || Spacewatch || — || align=right data-sort-value="0.88" | 880 m || 
|-id=989 bgcolor=#fefefe
| 250989 ||  || — || May 19, 2006 || Mount Lemmon || Mount Lemmon Survey || FLO || align=right data-sort-value="0.91" | 910 m || 
|-id=990 bgcolor=#fefefe
| 250990 ||  || — || May 21, 2006 || Mount Lemmon || Mount Lemmon Survey || — || align=right data-sort-value="0.87" | 870 m || 
|-id=991 bgcolor=#E9E9E9
| 250991 ||  || — || May 21, 2006 || Kitt Peak || Spacewatch || — || align=right | 2.7 km || 
|-id=992 bgcolor=#fefefe
| 250992 ||  || — || May 24, 2006 || Mount Lemmon || Mount Lemmon Survey || — || align=right data-sort-value="0.93" | 930 m || 
|-id=993 bgcolor=#fefefe
| 250993 ||  || — || May 28, 2006 || Socorro || LINEAR || — || align=right | 1.2 km || 
|-id=994 bgcolor=#fefefe
| 250994 ||  || — || June 17, 2006 || Kitt Peak || Spacewatch || NYS || align=right data-sort-value="0.89" | 890 m || 
|-id=995 bgcolor=#fefefe
| 250995 ||  || — || June 19, 2006 || Kitt Peak || Spacewatch || — || align=right | 1.8 km || 
|-id=996 bgcolor=#fefefe
| 250996 ||  || — || June 21, 2006 || Kitt Peak || Spacewatch || — || align=right | 1.2 km || 
|-id=997 bgcolor=#fefefe
| 250997 ||  || — || June 19, 2006 || Kitt Peak || Spacewatch || — || align=right data-sort-value="0.98" | 980 m || 
|-id=998 bgcolor=#fefefe
| 250998 ||  || — || July 19, 2006 || Palomar || NEAT || NYS || align=right | 1.0 km || 
|-id=999 bgcolor=#fefefe
| 250999 ||  || — || July 18, 2006 || Siding Spring || SSS || — || align=right | 3.1 km || 
|-id=000 bgcolor=#fefefe
| 251000 ||  || — || July 20, 2006 || Palomar || NEAT || — || align=right | 1.0 km || 
|}

References

External links 
 Discovery Circumstances: Numbered Minor Planets (250001)–(255000) (IAU Minor Planet Center)

0250